= Cleveland Athletic Club (ice hockey) =

Ice hockey team in Ohio, US

Cleveland A.C.
- City: Cleveland, Ohio; USA
- League: Exhib. games (1907–1920); USAHA (1920–1925)
- Founded: 1907–08
- Operated: 1907–1925
- Home arena: Elysium Arena

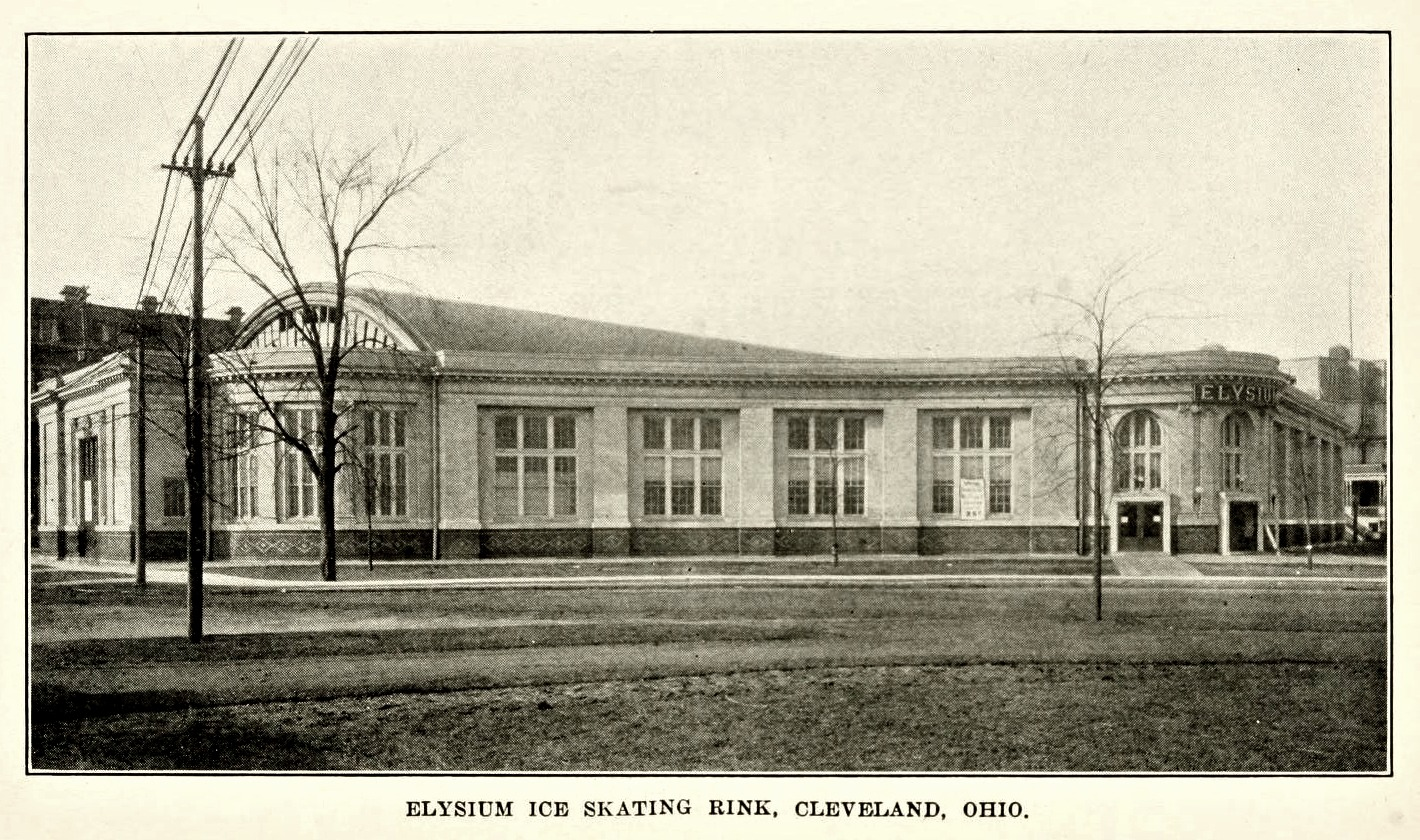
Elysium Arena.

The Cleveland Athletic Club ice hockey team was an amateur ice hockey team from Cleveland, Ohio, operating during the first three decades of the 20th century out of the Cleveland Athletic Club. When the team joined the United States Amateur Hockey Association for the 1920–21 season it was known as the Cleveland Indians or Cleveland Hockey Club, and in 1924–25 as the Cleveland Blues.

The team played at the Elysium Arena at the corner of E. 107th St. and Euclid in Cleveland.

== History ==
The Cleveland Athletic Club ice hockey team launched its operations for the 1907–08 season and played out of the newly built Elysium Arena at the corner of E. 107th St. and Euclid in Cleveland. The team had many Canadian imports such as Clarence "Moose" Jamieson, Harry Poland and Elmer Irving, but also American defenseman Frank "Coddy" Winters from Duluth, Minnesota who would become a longtime mainstay on the team.

=== 1915 Elysium Arena riot ===
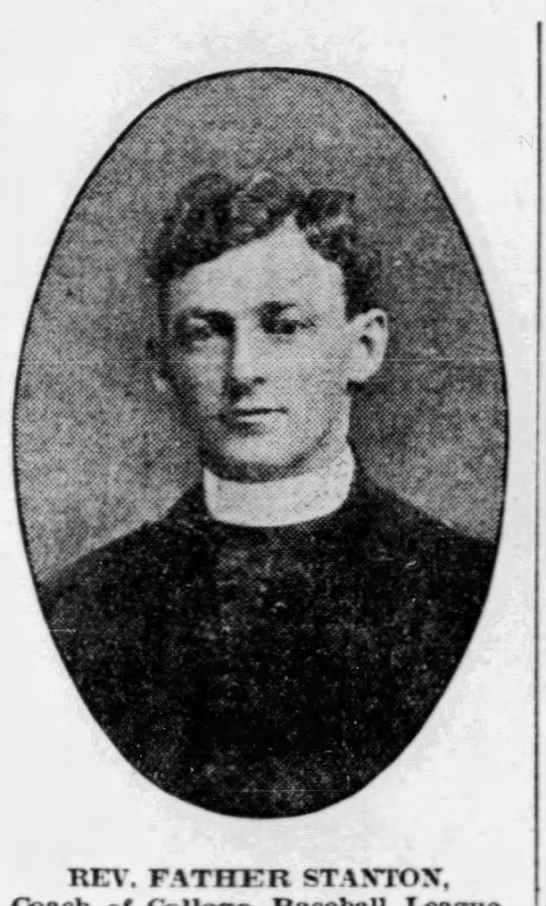
Father William Stanton.

During the 1910s Cleveland A.C. played in many exhibition games, against both American and Canadian teams. In late December 1914–early January 1915 the team played in a best-of-three series at the Elysium Arena against the visiting Ottawa College team, and the third contest between the two teams on January 2, 1915, developed into a full-scale riot on the ice, at the conclusion of the game, where the spectators eventually joined in and the police had to be called upon to quell the disturbance.

"Ottawa College will not play again in Cleveland. The trouble is that Cleveland wants to win by any means. We had to put up with incompetent officials besides being victims of brutal attacks of the opposing team, which culminated during the final match in the disgraceful scene I have described."

– Father William Stanton on the Elysium Arena riot

According to the Canadians the trouble had started when Cleveland player Coddy Winters first threatened to "get" every one of the visiting players, and then also verbally abused their coach Father William Stanton with "the coarsest language", and that it later escalated into a full-scale riot when Cleveland player Elmer Irving threatened both the referee and the Ottawa players after having been penalized.

The Cleveland version on the other hand laid the blame on Ottawa player Jim Burnett, claiming the riot had started when Burnett slashed Coddy Winters across the nose with his stick. In the following melee Ottawa's goaltender Vincent Doran hit Elmer Irving over the head with his stick, after Irving had held down Ed Nagle, which left Irving with a fractured skull. Cleveland's trainer then took part in the melee and hit Ottawa player Redmond Quain over the head with a bottle. The spectators (a 2,000 crowd) then jumped onto the ice to join in, and the police had to be called upon to quell the disturbance, with a number of people getting hurt in the ensuing panic. Vincent Doran was arrested on a charge of assault to kill, for his attack on Irving, and his teammate Redmond Quain also appeared in a Cleveland police court as a witness against the Cleveland team's trainer. Doran was later dismissed by the police court when Irving refused to prosecute him.

=== USAHA years (1920–1925) ===
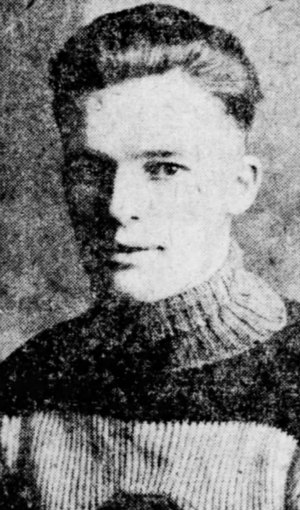
Nels Stewart.

In 1920–21 the team joined the newly formed United States Amateur Hockey Association, and were joined by a young Canadian centre forward from Toronto Parkdale of the Ontario Hockey Association named Nels Stewart. The acquisition turned out successful as Stewart was instrumental in helping Cleveland win the inaugural USAHA championship after the team defeated Eveleth 14 goals to 12 over a four-game series in early April 1921.

The team played four more years in the USAHA, until 1924–25, though without replicating its winning formula from 1920 to 1921. After the conclusion of the USAHA in 1925 Nels Stewart joined the Montreal Maroons of the National Hockey League where he became a Stanley Cup champion in 1926.

A new hockey team named the Cleveland Indians was transferred to the city from Kitchener in Ontario in 1929 to play in the International Hockey League.

== Notable players ==
- Nels Stewart – Hockey Hall of Fame inductee
- Frank "Coddy" Winters – United States Hockey Hall of Fame inductee
- Roy McGiffin
- Raymond Marchand

== See also ==
- Cleveland Indians (IHL team from 1929 to 1934)
