= 1910–11 Cornell Big Red men's ice hockey season =

Intercollegiate Champion Intercollegiate Hockey Association, Champion
- Conference: 1st IHA
- Home ice: Beebe Lake

Record
- Overall: 10–0–0
- Conference: 5–0–0
- Road: 3–0–0
- Neutral: 7–0–0

Coaches and captains
- Head coach: Talbot Hunter
- Captain: Edmund Magner

The 1910–11 Cornell Big Red men's ice hockey season was the 10th season of play for the program.

== Season ==
Despite not having ice to practice on early in their season the team was able to coalesce around a core of returning players. Returning to school for his senior season was Jefferson Vincent who had to earn his way back onto the team through several cuts and a demotion to the second squad. The potent combination of Vincent and Magner turned out to be instrumental in Cornell's success for the year.

The Big Red opened with a three-game series against Yale for the second consecutive year, this time playing in Chicago. Though the games were close Cornell was able to win each match. Magner and Crassweller played particularly well while Vincent recorded a hat-trick in the second game. On their way back east Cornell stopped in Cleveland for a two-game series against local colleges, winning both handily. Vincent notched his second 3-goal game against Western Reserve but it was Magner who starred with 5 scores to his credit.

Cornell opened its conference slate against defending champion Princeton and downed the Tigers with Magner and Vincent each providing 2 goals. After downing Yale for the fourth time that season Cornell entered the pivotal match against Harvard with a chance at their first championship. Both teams had shown themselves to be at the top of the collegiate hockey world with a combined 12–1 record and the winner was largely expected to claim the championship that season. The two teams fought a mostly even match with regulation ending in a 2–2 draw, but in the overtime Jefferson Vincent provided Cornell with perhaps its biggest single moment when he scored the game-winning goal.

While Cornell had two more game to play, they were against the comparatively weaker Columbia and Dartmouth clubs. Both Magner and Vincent again scored twice in the team's shutout of Columbia while a 5–1 win over Dartmouth sealed Cornell's first IHA championship.

The planets did seem to align for Cornell in 1911 as their 10 wins was the highest total the team would reach for over 50 years (they wouldn't even play 10 games in a single season again until 1940). None of their games were played at home, owing to the extended road trip and the poor quality of ice on Beebe Lake, but having star forward Jefferson Vincent on the team a year after he should have already graduated was an offensive boon for the Big Red.

== Roster ==
No.	Nat.	Player	Class	Pos	Height	Weight	DoB	Hometown	Previous team
	(Canada)	Frank Crassweller	Senior	R			1887-10-13	Huron, Ontario
	(United States)	George Evans	Senior	LW			1888-11-24	Great Barrington, Massachusetts
	(United States)	Foster Haist	Senior	D
	(United States)	Edmund Magner (C)	Senior	C			1888-02-10	Kalamazoo, Michigan
	(United States)	Edward Scheu	Sophomore	W/D			1890-08-28	Buffalo, New York
		E. L. Smith	Senior	D
	(United States)	Malcolm Vail	Junior	G			1888-10-04	Highland Park, Illinois
	(United States)	Jefferson Vincent	Senior	W			1888-05-03	Allegheny, Pennsylvania
	(United States)	Munroe Warner	Senior	D				Duluth, Minnesota

== Standings ==
1910–11 Collegiate ice hockey standings
	Intercollegiate							Overall					
	GP	W	L	T	PCT.	GF	GA	GP	W	L	T	GF	GA
Amherst	–	–	–	–	–	–	–	7	3	3	1	–	–
Army	4	1	3	0	.250	6	7	4	1	3	0	6	7
Case	–	–	–	–	–	–	–	–	–	–	–	–	–
Columbia	7	4	3	0	.571	22	19	7	4	3	0	22	19
Cornell	10	10	0	0	1.000	49	13	10	10	0	0	49	13
Dartmouth	7	2	5	0	.286	17	33	10	4	6	0	28	43
Harvard	8	7	1	0	.875	53	10	10	8	2	0	63	17
Massachusetts Agricultural	8	6	2	0	.750	39	17	9	7	2	0	44	21
MIT	4	3	1	0	.750	22	11	10	5	5	0	45	49
Pennsylvania	1	0	1	0	.000	0	7	1	0	1	0	0	7
Princeton	10	5	5	0	.500	31	31	10	5	5	0	31	31
Rensselaer	4	0	4	0	.000	5	35	4	0	4	0	5	35
Springfield Training	–	–	–	–	–	–	–	–	–	–	–	–	–
Stevens Tech	–	–	–	–	–	–	–	–	–	–	–	–	–
Trinity	–	–	–	–	–	–	–	–	–	–	–	–	–
Union	–	–	–	–	–	–	–	1	1	0	0	–	–
Western Reserve	–	–	–	–	–	–	–	–	–	–	–	–	–
Williams	7	2	4	1	.357	23	26	9	2	6	1	30	42
Yale	13	4	9	0	.308	43	49	16	6	10	0	59	62

1910–11 Intercollegiate Hockey Association standings
	Conference							Overall					
	GP	W	L	T	PTS	GF	GA	GP	W	L	T	GF	GA
Cornell *	5	5	0	0	10	20	6	10	10	0	0	49	13
Harvard	5	4	1	0	8	27	7	10	8	2	0	63	17
Columbia	5	2	3	0	4	9	17	7	4	3	0	22	19
Yale	5	2	3	0	4	16	15	16	6	10	0	59	62
Dartmouth	5	1	4	0	2	12	30	10	4	6	0	28	43
Princeton	5	1	4	0	2	7	16	10	5	5	0	31	31
* indicates conference champion

== Schedule and results ==
Date	Opponent	Site	Result	Record
Regular season
December 30	vs. Yale*	Chicago Ice Palace • Chicago, Illinois	W 4–3	1–0–0
December 31	vs. Yale*	Chicago Ice Palace • Chicago, Illinois	W 3–1	2–0–0
January 2	vs. Yale*	Chicago Ice Palace • Chicago, Illinois	W 4–2	3–0–0
January 3	at Case*	Elysium Arena • Cleveland, Ohio	W 5–1	4–0–0
January 4	at Western Reserve*	Elysium Arena • Cleveland, Ohio	W 13–0	5–0–0
January 14	vs. Princeton	St. Nicholas Rink • New York, New York	W 4–1	6–0–0 (1–0–0)
January 21	vs. Yale	St. Nicholas Rink • New York, New York	W 4–2	7–0–0 (2–0–0)
January 28	at Harvard	Boston Arena • Boston, Massachusetts	W 3–2 ^{OT}	8–0–0 (3–0–0)
February 10	at Columbia	St. Nicholas Rink • New York, New York	W 4–0	9–0–0 (4–0–0)
February 18	vs. Dartmouth	Boston Arena • Boston, Massachusetts	W 5–1	10–0–0 (5–0–0)
*Non-conference game.
