= 1907–08 Princeton Tigers men's ice hockey season =

College ice hockey season

- Conference: T–3rd IHA
- Home ice: Lake Carnegie

Record
- Overall: 8–7–0
- Conference: 1–3–0
- Home: 1–0–0
- Road: 5–3–0
- Neutral: 2–4–0

Coaches and captains
- Head coach: Afton Zaniser
- Captain: Ralph Osborne

The 1907–08 Princeton Tigers men's ice hockey season was the 9th season of play for the program.

== Season ==
After losing more than half of the championship roster to graduation it was unsurprising that the team took a step back in 1908. When Princeton headed into the winter break they did so with seven games on the slate. To help the team navigate its way through, two-year captain Afton Zaniser returned to coach the team. After a rough start the trip turned out remarkably well for the Tigers with the team winning three out of four in Cleveland. While the team had begun the season with Douglas Ballin in net they had found greater success when Peacock took over the role.

After the jam-packed schedule Princeton had little time to rest before beginning their conference schedule but still started with a win over Columbia. The Tigers weren't able to keep up with the remainder of the IHA, however, and lost their remaining conference games to finish in a tie for 3rd place. On a positive note, Princeton played its first true home game against Lawrenceville School, winning a weather-shortened match on Lake Carnegie.

Frederic Leake and Joshua Brush served as team managers.

== Roster ==
| No. | Nat. | Player | Class | Pos | Height | Weight | DoB | Hometown | Previous team |
|---|---|---|---|---|---|---|---|---|---|
| | | Cyril Ballin | Sophomore | F/D |
| | | Douglas Ballin | Junior | G/D |
| | | Joshua Brush | Junior | F |
| | | Charles Coxe | Junior | F |
| | | Joseph Leake | Sophomore | F/D |
| | | Alexander Milne Jr. | Junior | F/D |
| | | Ralph Osborne (C) | Senior | F/D |
| | | Clarence Peacock Jr. | Sophomore | G/D |
| | | Schuyler Phillips | Junior | F |
| | | Frederic Read | Sophomore | D |
| | | Roswell Rolston | Sophomore | G/D/F |

== Standings ==
1907–08 Collegiate ice hockey standings
| | Intercollegiate | | | | | | | Overall | | | | | |
| | GP | W | L | T | PCT. | GF | GA | GP | W | L | T | GF | GA |
|---|---|---|---|---|---|---|---|---|---|---|---|---|---|
| Army | 3 | 1 | 2 | 0 | .333 | 7 | 4 | 7 | 4 | 3 | 0 | 18 | 9 |
| Carnegie Tech | – | – | – | – | – | – | – | – | – | – | – | – | – |
| Columbia | 4 | 1 | 3 | 0 | .250 | 6 | 27 | 5 | 1 | 4 | 0 | 6 | 30 |
| Cornell | 3 | 3 | 0 | 0 | 1.000 | 16 | 0 | 4 | 4 | 0 | 0 | 21 | 0 |
| Dartmouth | 6 | 1 | 4 | 1 | .250 | 15 | 34 | 7 | 1 | 5 | 1 | 15 | 37 |
| Harvard | 4 | 3 | 1 | 0 | .750 | 32 | 9 | 9 | 7 | 2 | 0 | 55 | 17 |
| MIT | 6 | 4 | 2 | 0 | .667 | 15 | 11 | 8 | 6 | 2 | 0 | 26 | 11 |
| Princeton | 5 | 2 | 3 | 0 | .400 | 11 | 15 | 15 | 8 | 7 | 0 | 54 | 44 |
| Rensselaer | 5 | 2 | 2 | 1 | .500 | 19 | 11 | 5 | 2 | 2 | 1 | 19 | 11 |
| Rochester | – | – | – | – | – | – | – | – | – | – | – | – | – |
| Springfield Training | – | – | – | – | – | – | – | – | – | – | – | – | – |
| Trinity | – | – | – | – | – | – | – | – | – | – | – | – | – |
| Tufts | – | – | – | – | – | – | – | 5 | 1 | 4 | 0 | – | – |
| Union | – | – | – | – | – | – | – | 3 | 1 | 2 | 0 | – | – |
| Williams | 3 | 3 | 0 | 0 | 1.000 | 32 | 6 | 4 | 4 | 0 | 0 | 48 | 6 |
| Yale | 5 | 5 | 0 | 0 | 1.000 | 35 | 11 | 9 | 5 | 4 | 0 | 41 | 34 |

1907–08 Intercollegiate Hockey Association standings
| | Conference | | | | | | | Overall | | | | | |
| | GP | W | L | T | PTS | GF | GA | GP | W | L | T | GF | GA |
|---|---|---|---|---|---|---|---|---|---|---|---|---|---|
| Yale * | 4 | 4 | 0 | 0 | 8 | 28 | 10 | 9 | 5 | 4 | 0 | 41 | 34 |
| Harvard | 4 | 3 | 1 | 0 | 6 | 32 | 9 | 9 | 7 | 2 | 0 | 55 | 17 |
| Princeton | 4 | 1 | 3 | 0 | 2 | 9 | 15 | 15 | 8 | 7 | 0 | 54 | 44 |
| Dartmouth | 4 | 1 | 3 | 0 | 2 | 11 | 25 | 7 | 1 | 5 | 1 | 15 | 37 |
| Columbia | 4 | 1 | 3 | 0 | 2 | 6 | 27 | 5 | 1 | 4 | 0 | 6 | 30 |
* indicates conference champion

== Schedule and results ==
| Date | Opponent | Site | Result | Record |
Regular Season
| December 12 | vs. Brooklyn Crescents* | St. Nicholas Rink • New York, New York | L 4–11 | 0–1–0 |
| December 19 | at New York Wanderers* | St. Nicholas Rink • New York, New York | L 4–8 | 0–2–0 |
| December 20 | at New York Athletic Club* | St. Nicholas Rink • New York, New York | L 0–7 | 0–3–0 |
| December 29 | at Collegians Hockey Team* | Elysium Arena • Cleveland, Ohio | W 1–0 | 1–3–0 |
| December 30 | at Cleveland Hockey Team* | Elysium Arena • Cleveland, Ohio | W 9–0 | 2–3–0 |
| December 31 | vs. Pittsburgh Bankers* | Elysium Arena • Cleveland, Ohio | W 13–0 | 3–3–0 |
| January 1 | at Cleveland All-Stars* | Elysium Arena • Cleveland, Ohio | L 1–3 | 3–4–0 |
| January 2 | at New York Hockey Club* | St. Nicholas Rink • New York, New York | W 2–0 | 4–4–0 |
| January 5 | at Columbia | St. Nicholas Rink • New York, New York | W 1–0 | 5–4–0 (1–0–0) |
| January 8 | vs. Dartmouth | St. Nicholas Rink • New York, New York | L 2–3 | 5–5–0 (1–1–0) |
| January 12 | Lawrenceville School* | Lake Carnegie • Princeton, New Jersey | W 3–0 | 6–5–0 |
| January 18 | vs. Harvard | St. Nicholas Rink • New York, New York | L 2–6 | 6–6–0 (1–2–0) |
| February 5 | at Lawrenceville School* | Lawrenceville, New Jersey | W 6–0 | 7–6–0 |
| February 7 | vs. MIT* | St. Nicholas Rink • New York, New York | W 2–0 | 8–6–0 |
| February 8 | vs. Yale | St. Nicholas Rink • New York, New York | L 4–6 ^{2OT} | 8–7–0 (1–3–0) |
*Non-conference game.

Note: MIT records a game against Princeton on February 6 as well.

== Scoring Statistics ==
| Name | Position | Games | Goals |
|---|---|---|---|
| Charles Coxe | F | 12 | 16 |
| Schuyler Phillips | F | 15 | 13 |
| Ralph Osborne | F/D | 15 | 9 |
| Frederic Read | D | 15 | 7 |
| Joshua Brush | F | 15 | 4 |
| J. B. Leake | F/D | 12 | 3 |
| Alexander Milne | F/D | 5 | 1 |
| Cyril Ballin | F/D | 14 | 1 |
| Douglas Ballin | D/G | 2 | 0 |
| Roswell Rolston | F/D/G | 9 | 0 |
| Clarence Peacock | D/G | 15 | 0 |
| Total | | | 54 |

Note: Assists were not recorded as a statistic.
