= Frank Winters (disambiguation) =

Frank Winters (born 1964) is a former American football player.

Frank Winters may also refer to:

- Frank Winters (basketball) (1894–1980), American basketball and football coach
- Frank Winters (ice hockey) (1884–1944), American ice hockey player
