= 1910–11 Princeton Tigers men's ice hockey season =

College ice hockey season

- Conference: T–4th IHA
- Home ice: Lake Carnegie

Record
- Overall: 5–5–0
- Conference: 1–4–0
- Road: 2–0–0
- Neutral: 3–5–0

Coaches and captains
- Captain: Alfred Kay

The 1910–11 Princeton Tigers men's ice hockey season was the 12th season of play for the program.

== Season ==
Looking to defend their championship with most of the players returning, Princeton's biggest concern was finding a replacement for star netminder Clarence Peacock. Dean Kalbfleisch, who had seen limited action the year before, took over the role and played well early in the year against non-IHA opponents. After the three-game series with Yale, it was apparent that Kalbfleisch was not the same caliber as their former captain. However, the team's offense performed much better than they had the year before, so there was hope that the Tigers could repeat.

After starting league play with a win over an improved Columbia squad, Princeton was looking forward to the showdown with Harvard, but first they would have to get past a Cornell that was undefeated on the season. Whether they were looking past the Big Red or not, Princeton came out flat, allowing Cornell to score the game's first four goals en route to a 1–4 defeat for the Tigers. After suffering a further loss to Dartmouth, the wheels came off, and the Tigers sputtered to end the season with a four-game losing streak, finishing last in the IHA.

== Roster ==
No.	Nat.	Player	Class	Pos	Height	Weight	DoB	Hometown	Previous team
		Montgomery Angell	Senior	W
		Lawrence Blair	Junior
		Henry Day	Junior	RW
		Arba Faxon	Sophomore	RW
		Dean Kalbfleisch	Junior	G
	(United States)	Alfred Kay	Junior	R				Pittsburgh, Pennsylvania
		Robert C. Lee	Sophomore	D
		James I. Marsh	Senior	G
		Dean Mathey	Junior	C
		James McKinney	Junior	C
		Robert Patterson	Sophomore	W

== Standings ==
1910–11 Collegiate ice hockey standings
	Intercollegiate							Overall					
	GP	W	L	T	PCT.	GF	GA	GP	W	L	T	GF	GA
Amherst	–	–	–	–	–	–	–	7	3	3	1	–	–
Army	4	1	3	0	.250	6	7	4	1	3	0	6	7
Case	–	–	–	–	–	–	–	–	–	–	–	–	–
Columbia	7	4	3	0	.571	22	19	7	4	3	0	22	19
Cornell	10	10	0	0	1.000	49	13	10	10	0	0	49	13
Dartmouth	7	2	5	0	.286	17	33	10	4	6	0	28	43
Harvard	8	7	1	0	.875	53	10	10	8	2	0	63	17
Massachusetts Agricultural	8	6	2	0	.750	39	17	9	7	2	0	44	21
MIT	4	3	1	0	.750	22	11	10	5	5	0	45	49
Pennsylvania	1	0	1	0	.000	0	7	1	0	1	0	0	7
Princeton	10	5	5	0	.500	31	31	10	5	5	0	31	31
Rensselaer	4	0	4	0	.000	5	35	4	0	4	0	5	35
Springfield Training	–	–	–	–	–	–	–	–	–	–	–	–	–
Stevens Tech	–	–	–	–	–	–	–	–	–	–	–	–	–
Trinity	–	–	–	–	–	–	–	–	–	–	–	–	–
Union	–	–	–	–	–	–	–	1	1	0	0	–	–
Western Reserve	–	–	–	–	–	–	–	–	–	–	–	–	–
Williams	7	2	4	1	.357	23	26	9	2	6	1	30	42
Yale	13	4	9	0	.308	43	49	16	6	10	0	59	62

1910–11 Intercollegiate Hockey Association standings
	Conference							Overall					
	GP	W	L	T	PTS	GF	GA	GP	W	L	T	GF	GA
Cornell *	5	5	0	0	10	20	6	10	10	0	0	49	13
Harvard	5	4	1	0	8	27	7	10	8	2	0	63	17
Columbia	5	2	3	0	4	9	17	7	4	3	0	22	19
Yale	5	2	3	0	4	16	15	16	6	10	0	59	62
Dartmouth	5	1	4	0	2	12	30	10	4	6	0	28	43
Princeton	5	1	4	0	2	7	16	10	5	5	0	31	31
* indicates conference champion

== Schedule and results ==
Date	Opponent	Site	Result	Record
Regular season
December 17	vs. Pennsylvania*	St. Nicholas Rink • New York, New York	W 7–0	1–0–0
December 22	vs. Williams*	St. Nicholas Rink • New York, New York	W 3–2	2–0–0
December 27	vs. Yale*	Elysium Arena • Cleveland, Ohio	W 5–4 ^{OT}	3–0–0
December 28	vs. Yale*	Elysium Arena • Cleveland, Ohio	L 5–6	3–1–0
December 29	vs. Yale*	Elysium Arena • Cleveland, Ohio	W 4–3 ^{OT}	4–1–0
January 7	at Columbia	St. Nicholas Rink • New York, New York	W 2–0	5–1–0 (1–0–0)
January 11	at New York Athletic Club	St. Nicholas Rink • New York, New York (Exhibition)	W 1–0	
January 14	vs. Cornell	St. Nicholas Rink • New York, New York	L 1–4	5–2–0 (1–1–0)
January 18	vs. Dartmouth	St. Nicholas Rink • New York, New York	L 3–6	5–3–0 (1–2–0)
January 21	vs. Harvard	St. Nicholas Rink • New York, New York	L 1–5	5–4–0 (1–3–0)
January 28	vs. Yale	St. Nicholas Rink • New York, New York	L 0–1	5–5–0 (1–4–0)
*Non-conference game.

== Scoring statistics ==
Name	Position	Games	Goals
Alfred Kay	R	10	15
James McKinney	C	10	6
Robert Patterson	W	10	4
Henry Day	RW	2	2
Montgomery Angell	W	9	2
Lawrence Blair	D	10	2
Dean Mathey	C	1	0
James Marsh	G	1	0
Arba Faxon	RW	1	0
Robert Lee	D	10	0
Dean Kalbfleisch	G	10	0
Total			31

Note: Assists were not recorded as a statistic.
