= 1910–11 Harvard Crimson men's ice hockey season =

College ice hockey season

- Conference: 2nd IHA
- Home ice: Boston Arena

Record
- Overall: 8–2–0
- Conference: 4–1–0
- Home: 7–2–0
- Neutral: 1–0–0

Coaches and captains
- Head coach: Alfred Winsor
- Captain: Ralph Hornblower

The 1910–11 Harvard Crimson men's ice hockey season was the 14th season of play for the program.

== Season ==
Prior to the season Harvard was able to reach a deal with the recently constructed Boston Arena to use the facility for both practice and games. This was the first year where the Crimson would have both indoor and/or artificial ice available which would negate the cancelling of games due to poor weather conditions. Harvard would play nine of their ten games at the Boston Arena and performed about as well as they had at the Harvard Stadium Rink the year before.

With the arena available to them Harvard scheduled five games early in the season against non-conference opponents and gave a strong showing. The Crimson won four of the matches and entered the conference season looking for revenge against Princeton. After dispatching Columbia Harvard welcomed the Tigers to the new home with a convincing win. Their next match turned out to be the game of the season when undefeated Cornell came to town. The two scarlet clubs battled to a 2–2 draw after regulation and, with the IHA crown in the balance, Cornell's Jefferson Vincent scored the game-winner.

Though their hopes for a championship had been dashed, the Crimson ended the season with two more victories for a 8–2 record and a second consecutive runner-up finish in the IHA.

== Roster ==
No.	Nat.	Player	Class	Pos	Height	Weight	DoB	Hometown	Previous team
	(United States)	Robert Blackall	Junior	D	5' 9" (1.75 m)	168 lb (76 kg)	1889-04-26	Cambridge, Massachusetts
	(United States)	Oliver Chadwick		G			1888-09-23	Lowell, Massachusetts
		John Childs	Junior	F
		Robert Duncan	Junior	F	5' 6" (1.68 m)	132 lb (60 kg)
		Newton Foster	Senior	D
		Henry Gardner	Sophomore	G	5' 9" (1.75 m)	152 lb (69 kg)
		Thomas Gorham	Sophomore	F
		Edward Graustein	Sophomore	D
	(United States)	Ralph Hornblower (C)	Senior	F			1892-11-17	Arlington, Massachusetts
		Philip Houston	Junior	D	5' 11" (1.8 m)	161 lb (73 kg)
	(United States)	Frederic Huntington	Junior	F/D	5' 8" (1.73 m)	165 lb (75 kg)	1889-12-05	Ashfield, Massachusetts
		Howard Leslie	Junior	F
	(United States)	Edward P. Pierce Jr.	Junior	F	5' 7" (1.7 m)	143 lb (65 kg)	1889-06-17	Fitchburg, Massachusetts
		John Pratt	Junior	F
		William Seamans Jr.	Senior				1889-02-18
		Stephen Smart	Junior	G	5' 7" (1.7 m)	150 lb (68 kg)

== Standings ==
1910–11 Collegiate ice hockey standings
	Intercollegiate							Overall					
	GP	W	L	T	PCT.	GF	GA	GP	W	L	T	GF	GA
Amherst	–	–	–	–	–	–	–	7	3	3	1	–	–
Army	4	1	3	0	.250	6	7	4	1	3	0	6	7
Case	–	–	–	–	–	–	–	–	–	–	–	–	–
Columbia	7	4	3	0	.571	22	19	7	4	3	0	22	19
Cornell	10	10	0	0	1.000	49	13	10	10	0	0	49	13
Dartmouth	7	2	5	0	.286	17	33	10	4	6	0	28	43
Harvard	8	7	1	0	.875	53	10	10	8	2	0	63	17
Massachusetts Agricultural	8	6	2	0	.750	39	17	9	7	2	0	44	21
MIT	4	3	1	0	.750	22	11	10	5	5	0	45	49
Pennsylvania	1	0	1	0	.000	0	7	1	0	1	0	0	7
Princeton	10	5	5	0	.500	31	31	10	5	5	0	31	31
Rensselaer	4	0	4	0	.000	5	35	4	0	4	0	5	35
Springfield Training	–	–	–	–	–	–	–	–	–	–	–	–	–
Stevens Tech	–	–	–	–	–	–	–	–	–	–	–	–	–
Trinity	–	–	–	–	–	–	–	–	–	–	–	–	–
Union	–	–	–	–	–	–	–	1	1	0	0	–	–
Western Reserve	–	–	–	–	–	–	–	–	–	–	–	–	–
Williams	7	2	4	1	.357	23	26	9	2	6	1	30	42
Yale	13	4	9	0	.308	43	49	16	6	10	0	59	62

1910–11 Intercollegiate Hockey Association standings
	Conference							Overall					
	GP	W	L	T	PTS	GF	GA	GP	W	L	T	GF	GA
Cornell *	5	5	0	0	10	20	6	10	10	0	0	49	13
Harvard	5	4	1	0	8	27	7	10	8	2	0	63	17
Columbia	5	2	3	0	4	9	17	7	4	3	0	22	19
Yale	5	2	3	0	4	16	15	16	6	10	0	59	62
Dartmouth	5	1	4	0	2	12	30	10	4	6	0	28	43
Princeton	5	1	4	0	2	7	16	10	5	5	0	31	31
* indicates conference champion

== Schedule and results ==
Date	Opponent	Site	Result	Record
Regular Season
December 14	vs. MIT*	Boston Arena • Boston, Massachusetts	W 4–3	1–0–0
December 17	Amherst*	Boston Arena • Boston, Massachusetts	W 10–0	2–0–0
January 4	Springfield Training*	Boston Arena • Boston, Massachusetts	W 12–0	3–0–0
January 7	McGill*	Boston Arena • Boston, Massachusetts	L 2–5	3–1–0
January 11	St. Francis Xavier*	Boston Arena • Boston, Massachusetts	W 8–2	4–1–0
January 16	Columbia	Boston Arena • Boston, Massachusetts	W 5–0	5–1–0 (1–0–0)
January 21	vs. Princeton	Boston Arena • Boston, Massachusetts	W 5–1	6–1–0 (2–0–0)
January 28	Cornell	Boston Arena • Boston, Massachusetts	L 2–3 ^{OT}	6–2–0 (2–1–0)
February 4	Dartmouth	Boston Arena • Boston, Massachusetts	W 12–1	7–2–0 (3–1–0)
February 18	vs. Yale	St. Nicholas Rink • New York, New York (Rivalry)	W 3–2	8–2–0 (4–1–0)
*Non-conference game.
