= Duluth Hardware Kellys =

Amateur ice hockey team

The Duluth Hardware Kellys were an amateur ice hockey team based in Duluth, Minnesota during the early 1900s. In 1907, the team won the U.S. Amateur championship. When the U.S. Hockey Hall of Fame opened in Eveleth, Minnesota in 1973, Coddy Winters, of the team, was one of the first players to be enshrined in the Hall. The team was sponsored by Northern Kelly Hardware, who would later go on to sponsor the Duluth Kelleys of the National Football League from 1923-1925.
