= 1907–08 Cornell Big Red men's ice hockey season =

- Home ice: Beebe Lake

Record
- Overall: 4–0–0
- Home: 2–0–0
- Road: 2–0–0

Coaches and captains
- Captain: Ralph Lally

The 1907–08 Cornell Big Red men's ice hockey season was the 7th season of play for the program.

== Season ==
Cornell doubled its number of games from the previous season, playing two at home and two on the road. For the second straight season the Big Red didn't surrender a single goal to their opponents while scoring 21 times over the course of four games.

The team did not have a head coach but Jefferson Vincent served as team manager.

== Roster ==
No.	Nat.	Player	Class	Pos	Height	Weight	DoB	Hometown	Previous team
		George Adler		G			1886-02-14
		Edward Greer		LW			1885-08-01
		Harold Jones	Sophomore	F
	(United States)	Ralph Lally (C)	Senior	R			1885-06-17	Pittsburgh, Pennsylvania
		William Matchneer	Sophomore	D			1886-12-04
		Harry Reiber		RW
	(United States)	Myron Sayles		D			1885-11-05	Pittsfield, Massachusetts
	(United States)	Jefferson Vincent	Sophomore	F			1888-05-03	Allegheny, Pennsylvania
	(United States)	Curtis Yohe	Junior	C			1887-09-22	Connellsville, Pennsylvania

== Standings ==
1907–08 Collegiate ice hockey standings
	Intercollegiate							Overall					
	GP	W	L	T	PCT.	GF	GA	GP	W	L	T	GF	GA
Army	3	1	2	0	.333	7	4	7	4	3	0	18	9
Carnegie Tech	–	–	–	–	–	–	–	–	–	–	–	–	–
Columbia	4	1	3	0	.250	6	27	5	1	4	0	6	30
Cornell	3	3	0	0	1.000	16	0	4	4	0	0	21	0
Dartmouth	6	1	4	1	.250	15	34	7	1	5	1	15	37
Harvard	4	3	1	0	.750	32	9	9	7	2	0	55	17
MIT	6	4	2	0	.667	15	11	8	6	2	0	26	11
Princeton	5	2	3	0	.400	11	15	15	8	7	0	54	44
Rensselaer	5	2	2	1	.500	19	11	5	2	2	1	19	11
Rochester	–	–	–	–	–	–	–	–	–	–	–	–	–
Springfield Training	–	–	–	–	–	–	–	–	–	–	–	–	–
Trinity	–	–	–	–	–	–	–	–	–	–	–	–	–
Tufts	–	–	–	–	–	–	–	5	1	4	0	–	–
Union	–	–	–	–	–	–	–	3	1	2	0	–	–
Williams	3	3	0	0	1.000	32	6	4	4	0	0	48	6
Yale	5	5	0	0	1.000	35	11	9	5	4	0	41	34

== Schedule and results ==
Date	Opponent	Site	Result	Record
Regular season
January 18	at Army*	Lusk Reservoir • West Point, New York	W 2–0	1–0–0
January 31	at Rensselaer*	Empire Rink • Albany, New York	W 4–0	2–0–0
February 8	Cascadilla*	Beebe Lake • Ithaca, New York	W 5–0	3–0–0
	Rochester*	Beebe Lake • Ithaca, New York	W 10–0	4–0–0
*Non-conference game.
