= 1910–11 Columbia Lions men's ice hockey season =

- Conference: T–3rd IHA
- Home ice: St. Nicholas Rink

Record
- Overall: 4–3–0
- Conference: 2–3–0
- Home: 1–2–0
- Road: 2–1–0
- Neutral: 1–0–0

Coaches and captains
- Head coach: Percy LeSueur
- Captain: John Lovejoy

The 1910–11 Columbia Lions men's ice hockey season was the 15th season of play for the program.

== Season ==
In order to bring the ice hockey club out of its two-year funk, Columbia engaged Ottawa Senators goaltender Percy LeSueur to coach the team. Hopes were high when practices began in December but when all players vying for the job in goal were ruled ineligible a frantic search for a replacement was made. Despite the trouble Columbia got off to a good start, winning both games on a season-opening road trip to Cleveland.

Columbia opened the IHA schedule with a loss against defending champion Princeton but were able to defeat Yale in their next game. The win over the Bulldogs was the first for the Lions over a conference opponent in almost three years. Columbia couldn't keep up the pace against the likes of Harvard but their close victory over Dartmouth was their first away from the St. Nicholas Rink in at least six years.

Columbia finished with a winning record for the first time since 1900 and though they weren't a match for the upper echelon of college hockey they were at least no longer being embarrassed.

== Roster ==
No.	Nat.	Player	Class	Pos	Height	Weight	DoB	Hometown	Previous team
		Francis N. Bangs	Sophomore	W
		John S. Bates	Sophomore	R/C
		Harold H. Duden	Senior	D/LW
		J. Phelps Harding	Sophomore	F/D
		Robert W. Harris	Sophomore	RW
		Warren Kinney	Senior	D/LW
		John Lovejoy (C)	Senior	R/LW
		Rufus Trimble	Sophomore	D
		Frank B. Washburn	Graduate	G
		Bache M. Whitlock	Sophomore	RW

== Standings ==
1910–11 Collegiate ice hockey standings
	Intercollegiate							Overall					
	GP	W	L	T	PCT.	GF	GA	GP	W	L	T	GF	GA
Amherst	–	–	–	–	–	–	–	7	3	3	1	–	–
Army	4	1	3	0	.250	6	7	4	1	3	0	6	7
Case	–	–	–	–	–	–	–	–	–	–	–	–	–
Columbia	7	4	3	0	.571	22	19	7	4	3	0	22	19
Cornell	10	10	0	0	1.000	49	13	10	10	0	0	49	13
Dartmouth	7	2	5	0	.286	17	33	10	4	6	0	28	43
Harvard	8	7	1	0	.875	53	10	10	8	2	0	63	17
Massachusetts Agricultural	8	6	2	0	.750	39	17	9	7	2	0	44	21
MIT	4	3	1	0	.750	22	11	10	5	5	0	45	49
Pennsylvania	1	0	1	0	.000	0	7	1	0	1	0	0	7
Princeton	10	5	5	0	.500	31	31	10	5	5	0	31	31
Rensselaer	4	0	4	0	.000	5	35	4	0	4	0	5	35
Springfield Training	–	–	–	–	–	–	–	–	–	–	–	–	–
Stevens Tech	–	–	–	–	–	–	–	–	–	–	–	–	–
Trinity	–	–	–	–	–	–	–	–	–	–	–	–	–
Union	–	–	–	–	–	–	–	1	1	0	0	–	–
Western Reserve	–	–	–	–	–	–	–	–	–	–	–	–	–
Williams	7	2	4	1	.357	23	26	9	2	6	1	30	42
Yale	13	4	9	0	.308	43	49	16	6	10	0	59	62

1910–11 Intercollegiate Hockey Association standings
	Conference							Overall					
	GP	W	L	T	PTS	GF	GA	GP	W	L	T	GF	GA
Cornell *	5	5	0	0	10	20	6	10	10	0	0	49	13
Harvard	5	4	1	0	8	27	7	10	8	2	0	63	17
Columbia	5	2	3	0	4	9	17	7	4	3	0	22	19
Yale	5	2	3	0	4	16	15	16	6	10	0	59	62
Dartmouth	5	1	4	0	2	12	30	10	4	6	0	28	43
Princeton	5	1	4	0	2	7	16	10	5	5	0	31	31
* indicates conference champion

== Schedule and results ==
Date	Opponent	Site	Result	Record
Regular Season
December 21	at Case*	Elysium Arena • Cleveland, Ohio	W 5–2	1–0–0
December 22	at Western Reserve*	Elysium Arena • Cleveland, Ohio	W 8–0	2–0–0
January 7	Princeton	St. Nicholas Rink • New York, New York	L 0–2	2–1–0 (0–1–0)
January 11	Yale	St. Nicholas Rink • New York, New York	W 6–4 ^{OT}	3–1–0 (1–1–0)
January 16	at Harvard	Boston Arena • Boston, Massachusetts	L 0–5	3–2–0 (1–2–0)
January 20	vs. Dartmouth	Boston Arena • Boston, Massachusetts	W 3–2	4–2–0 (2–2–0)
February 10	Cornell	St. Nicholas Rink • New York, New York	L 0–4	4–3–0 (2–3–0)
*Non-conference game.
