= 1907–08 RPI men's ice hockey season =

- Conference: Independent

Record
- Overall: 2–2–1
- Home: 1–2–1
- Road: 1–0–0

Coaches and captains
- Captain: Allen Breed

The 1907–08 RPI men's ice hockey season was the 5th season of play for the program.

== Season ==
For their fifth season Rensselaer was able to play one of the Intercollegiate Hockey Association member teams for the first time when they played Dartmouth. RPI performed admirably, finishing with a tie. In the final game of their season RPI decimated local rival Union 14–2 in the last meeting between the two for over 15 years.

Note: Rensselaer's athletic teams were unofficially known as 'Cherry and White' until 1921 when the Engineers moniker debuted for the men's basketball team.

== Roster ==
No.	Nat.	Player	Class	Pos	Height	Weight	DoB	Hometown	Previous team
		Allen Breed (C)	Sophomore

== Standings ==
1907–08 Collegiate ice hockey standings
	Intercollegiate							Overall					
	GP	W	L	T	PCT.	GF	GA	GP	W	L	T	GF	GA
Army	3	1	2	0	.333	7	4	7	4	3	0	18	9
Carnegie Tech	–	–	–	–	–	–	–	–	–	–	–	–	–
Columbia	4	1	3	0	.250	6	27	5	1	4	0	6	30
Cornell	3	3	0	0	1.000	16	0	4	4	0	0	21	0
Dartmouth	6	1	4	1	.250	15	34	7	1	5	1	15	37
Harvard	4	3	1	0	.750	32	9	9	7	2	0	55	17
MIT	6	4	2	0	.667	15	11	8	6	2	0	26	11
Princeton	5	2	3	0	.400	11	15	15	8	7	0	54	44
Rensselaer	5	2	2	1	.500	19	11	5	2	2	1	19	11
Rochester	–	–	–	–	–	–	–	–	–	–	–	–	–
Springfield Training	–	–	–	–	–	–	–	–	–	–	–	–	–
Trinity	–	–	–	–	–	–	–	–	–	–	–	–	–
Tufts	–	–	–	–	–	–	–	5	1	4	0	–	–
Union	–	–	–	–	–	–	–	3	1	2	0	–	–
Williams	3	3	0	0	1.000	32	6	4	4	0	0	48	6
Yale	5	5	0	0	1.000	35	11	9	5	4	0	41	34

== Schedule and results ==
Date	Opponent	Site	Result	Record
Regular Season
January 4	at Carnegie Tech*	Duquesne Garden • Pittsburgh, Pennsylvania	W 1–0	1–0–0
January 10	Williams*	Empire Rink • Albany, New York	L 0–1	1–1–0
January 17	Dartmouth*	Empire Rink • Albany, New York	T 4–4 ^{OT}	1–1–1
January 31	Cornell*	Empire Rink • Albany, New York	L 0–4	1–2–1
February 22	Union*	Empire Rink • Albany, New York	W 14–2	2–2–1
*Non-conference game.
