= 1907–08 MIT Engineers men's ice hockey season =

- Conference: Independent

Record
- Overall: 6–2–0

Coaches and captains
- Captain: Winthrop Ford

The 1907–08 MIT Engineers men's ice hockey season was the 9th season of play for the program.

== Season ==
The team did not have a head coach but William Kelly served as team manager.

Massachusetts Institute of Technology athletics were referred to as 'Engineers' or 'Techmen' during the first two decades of the 20th century. By 1920 all sports programs had adopted the Engineer moniker.

== Roster ==
No.	Nat.	Player	Class	Pos	Height	Weight	DoB	Hometown	Previous team
		Harold Billings	Sophomore	G
		John Davis	Junior	D
		Winthrop Ford (C)	Senior	F
		Allen Gould	Sophomore	D
		William Kelly	Junior	F
		William O'Hearn	Sophomore	F
		Harold Paine	Junior	F
		Philip Taylor	Sophomore

== Standings ==
1907–08 Collegiate ice hockey standings
	Intercollegiate							Overall					
	GP	W	L	T	PCT.	GF	GA	GP	W	L	T	GF	GA
Army	3	1	2	0	.333	7	4	7	4	3	0	18	9
Carnegie Tech	–	–	–	–	–	–	–	–	–	–	–	–	–
Columbia	4	1	3	0	.250	6	27	5	1	4	0	6	30
Cornell	3	3	0	0	1.000	16	0	4	4	0	0	21	0
Dartmouth	6	1	4	1	.250	15	34	7	1	5	1	15	37
Harvard	4	3	1	0	.750	32	9	9	7	2	0	55	17
MIT	6	4	2	0	.667	15	11	8	6	2	0	26	11
Princeton	5	2	3	0	.400	11	15	15	8	7	0	54	44
Rensselaer	5	2	2	1	.500	19	11	5	2	2	1	19	11
Rochester	–	–	–	–	–	–	–	–	–	–	–	–	–
Springfield Training	–	–	–	–	–	–	–	–	–	–	–	–	–
Trinity	–	–	–	–	–	–	–	–	–	–	–	–	–
Tufts	–	–	–	–	–	–	–	5	1	4	0	–	–
Union	–	–	–	–	–	–	–	3	1	2	0	–	–
Williams	3	3	0	0	1.000	32	6	4	4	0	0	48	6
Yale	5	5	0	0	1.000	35	11	9	5	4	0	41	34

== Schedule and results ==
Date	Opponent	Site	Result	Record
Regular Season
January 11	Philips Academy*		W 7–0	1–0–0
January 15	Tufts*	Franklin Park • Boston, Massachusetts	W 4–1	2–0–0
January 18	Brae Burn Country Club*		W 4–0	3–0–0
February 5	at Yale*	New Haven, Connecticut	L 1–7	3–1–0
February 6 †	vs. Princeton*	St. Nicholas Rink • New York, New York	W 3–0	4–1–0
February 7	vs. Princeton*	St. Nicholas Rink • New York, New York	L 0–2	4–2–0
February 8	at Army*	West Point, New York	W 2–1	5–2–0
February 10	Dartmouth*	Brae Burn Rink • Newton, Massachusetts	W 5–0	6–2–0
*Non-conference game.

† Princeton records do not include the game played on February 6.
