= 1910–11 Penn Quakers men's ice hockey season =

Record
- Overall: 0–1–0
- Neutral: 0–1–0

Coaches and captains
- Captain: Joseph Hayden

The 1910–11 Penn Quakers men's ice hockey season was the 7th season of play for the program.

== Season ==
In the slow rebuild of the program, Penn was looking to return to the Intercollegiate Hockey Association for the 1911–12 season. With that goal in mind the Quakers sought to have a good season to prove that they belonged in the conference. Unfortunately the first squad they faced was defending champion Princeton and the Quakers were outmatched in a 0–7 defeat. Over the winter break the team was to play a two-game series in Cleveland, however, no mention of the trip can be found in the University newspaper.

A further game was scheduled in February against Army but that game was never played. While efforts were made to secure opponents for the team, nothing came to fruition and the season ended with a whimper.

While the effort to restart the ice hockey program had begun well, the lack of a local rink to use became too big of a stumbling block for the team and efforts to keep it afloat ceased. Ironically, the IHA, the league that Penn wanted to rejoin, would not survive much longer either. The conference would collapse by the end of the 1912–13 season.

== Roster ==
| No. | Nat. | Player | Class | Pos | Height | Weight | DoB | Hometown | Previous team |
|---|---|---|---|---|---|---|---|---|---|
| | | Armstrong | | RW |
| | | George E. H. DeWitt | Senior | C |
| | | Walter G. Hayden (C) | Senior | D |
| | | Edward A. King | Junior | R |
| | | Leon J. Le Tourneau | Freshman | LW |
| | | Edmund Thayer | Junior | LW |
| | | Walter S. Ward | Sophomore | G |
| | | W. H. Young | | D |

== Standings ==
1910–11 Collegiate ice hockey standings
| | Intercollegiate | | | | | | | Overall | | | | | |
| | GP | W | L | T | PCT. | GF | GA | GP | W | L | T | GF | GA |
|---|---|---|---|---|---|---|---|---|---|---|---|---|---|
| Amherst | – | – | – | – | – | – | – | 7 | 3 | 3 | 1 | – | – |
| Army | 4 | 1 | 3 | 0 | .250 | 6 | 7 | 4 | 1 | 3 | 0 | 6 | 7 |
| Case | – | – | – | – | – | – | – | – | – | – | – | – | – |
| Columbia | 7 | 4 | 3 | 0 | .571 | 22 | 19 | 7 | 4 | 3 | 0 | 22 | 19 |
| Cornell | 10 | 10 | 0 | 0 | 1.000 | 49 | 13 | 10 | 10 | 0 | 0 | 49 | 13 |
| Dartmouth | 7 | 2 | 5 | 0 | .286 | 17 | 33 | 10 | 4 | 6 | 0 | 28 | 43 |
| Harvard | 8 | 7 | 1 | 0 | .875 | 53 | 10 | 10 | 8 | 2 | 0 | 63 | 17 |
| Massachusetts Agricultural | 8 | 6 | 2 | 0 | .750 | 39 | 17 | 9 | 7 | 2 | 0 | 44 | 21 |
| MIT | 4 | 3 | 1 | 0 | .750 | 22 | 11 | 10 | 5 | 5 | 0 | 45 | 49 |
| Pennsylvania | 1 | 0 | 1 | 0 | .000 | 0 | 7 | 1 | 0 | 1 | 0 | 0 | 7 |
| Princeton | 10 | 5 | 5 | 0 | .500 | 31 | 31 | 10 | 5 | 5 | 0 | 31 | 31 |
| Rensselaer | 4 | 0 | 4 | 0 | .000 | 5 | 35 | 4 | 0 | 4 | 0 | 5 | 35 |
| Springfield Training | – | – | – | – | – | – | – | – | – | – | – | – | – |
| Stevens Tech | – | – | – | – | – | – | – | – | – | – | – | – | – |
| Trinity | – | – | – | – | – | – | – | – | – | – | – | – | – |
| Union | – | – | – | – | – | – | – | 1 | 1 | 0 | 0 | – | – |
| Western Reserve | – | – | – | – | – | – | – | – | – | – | – | – | – |
| Williams | 7 | 2 | 4 | 1 | .357 | 23 | 26 | 9 | 2 | 6 | 1 | 30 | 42 |
| Yale | 13 | 4 | 9 | 0 | .308 | 43 | 49 | 16 | 6 | 10 | 0 | 59 | 62 |

== Schedule and results ==
| Date | Opponent | Site | Result | Record |
Regular Season
| December 17 | vs. Princeton* | St. Nicholas Rink • New York, New York | L 0–7 | 0–1–0 |
*Non-conference game.
