= 1907–08 Yale Bulldogs men's ice hockey season =

College ice hockey season

Intercollegiate Champion Intercollegiate Hockey Association, Champion
- Conference: 1st IHA

Record
- Overall: 5–4–0
- Conference: 4–0–0
- Home: 1–0–0
- Road: 3–3–0
- Neutral: 1–1–0

Coaches and captains
- Captain: Harold Stanley

The 1907–08 Yale Bulldogs men's ice hockey season was the 13th season of play for the program.

== Season ==
Yale began its season poorly, losing its first three games and not contending much in any. However, because those game were against professional hockey clubs, the losses did not harm the Elis as far as the Intercollegiate season went. When they did play their fellow colleges, starting in mid-January, Yale's recent embarrassment against the pros may have lit a fire under them because the Bulldogs torched their next three opponents. After defeating defending champion Princeton, Yale lost its fourth contest to a pro squad before gearing up for their final game of the year. The Elis met Harvard at the St. Nicholas Rink on February 15 and, with both teams entering undefeated against college opponents, the winner would claim the Intercollegiate championship. Yale had failed to overcome the Crimson every season since 1902 but with two goals from John Heron, the Bulldogs were finally able to slay the Crimson dragon and win their fifth intercollegiate title.

The team did not have a coach, however, Tyson Dines served as team manager.

== Roster ==
No.	Nat.	Player	Class	Pos	Height	Weight	DoB	Hometown	Previous team
	(United States)	Donald C. Bakewell	Senior	G			1887-12-05	Salem, Ohio
	(United States)	Lucius Biglow	Senior	D			1885-02-28	Brooklyn, New York
		Conrad Driscoll	Senior	R
		Grover C. Fels	Junior	F			1885-10-09
		John Heron	Sophomore	F
		Henry Howe	Junior	G
	(United States)	Harold Stanley (C)	Senior	F			1885-10-02	Great Barrington, Massachusetts
		Leonard Stanley	Sophomore
		Gordon Thayer	Senior	D
		Charley Williams	Senior	D

== Standings ==
1907–08 Collegiate ice hockey standings
	Intercollegiate							Overall					
	GP	W	L	T	PCT.	GF	GA	GP	W	L	T	GF	GA
Army	3	1	2	0	.333	7	4	7	4	3	0	18	9
Carnegie Tech	–	–	–	–	–	–	–	–	–	–	–	–	–
Columbia	4	1	3	0	.250	6	27	5	1	4	0	6	30
Cornell	3	3	0	0	1.000	16	0	4	4	0	0	21	0
Dartmouth	6	1	4	1	.250	15	34	7	1	5	1	15	37
Harvard	4	3	1	0	.750	32	9	9	7	2	0	55	17
MIT	6	4	2	0	.667	15	11	8	6	2	0	26	11
Princeton	5	2	3	0	.400	11	15	15	8	7	0	54	44
Rensselaer	5	2	2	1	.500	19	11	5	2	2	1	19	11
Rochester	–	–	–	–	–	–	–	–	–	–	–	–	–
Springfield Training	–	–	–	–	–	–	–	–	–	–	–	–	–
Trinity	–	–	–	–	–	–	–	–	–	–	–	–	–
Tufts	–	–	–	–	–	–	–	5	1	4	0	–	–
Union	–	–	–	–	–	–	–	3	1	2	0	–	–
Williams	3	3	0	0	1.000	32	6	4	4	0	0	48	6
Yale	5	5	0	0	1.000	35	11	9	5	4	0	41	34

1907–08 Intercollegiate Hockey Association standings
	Conference							Overall					
	GP	W	L	T	PTS	GF	GA	GP	W	L	T	GF	GA
Yale *	4	4	0	0	8	28	10	9	5	4	0	41	34
Harvard	4	3	1	0	6	32	9	9	7	2	0	55	17
Princeton	4	1	3	0	2	9	15	15	8	7	0	54	44
Dartmouth	4	1	3	0	2	11	25	7	1	5	1	15	37
Columbia	4	1	3	0	2	6	27	5	1	4	0	6	30
* indicates conference champion

== Schedule and results ==
Date	Opponent	Site	Result	Record
Regular season
December 11	at New York Wanderers*	St. Nicholas Rink • New York, New York	L 3–10	0–1–0
December 17	vs. Brooklyn Crescents*	St. Nicholas Rink • New York, New York	L 1–3	0–2–0
January 3	vs. Brooklyn Crescents*	St. Nicholas Rink • New York, New York	L 1–6	0–3–0
January 15	vs. Dartmouth	St. Nicholas Rink • New York, New York	W 9–3	1–3–0 (1–0–0)
January 24	at Columbia	St. Nicholas Rink • New York, New York	W 10–1	2–3–0 (2–0–0)
February 5	MIT*	New Haven Lawn Club • New Haven, Connecticut	W 7–1	3–3–0
February 8	vs. Princeton	St. Nicholas Rink • New York, New York	W 6–4	4–3–0 (3–0–0)
February 13	vs. Brooklyn Crescents*	Washington Park Rink • New York, New York	L 1–4	4–4–0
February 17	vs. Harvard	St. Nicholas Rink • New York, New York (Rivalry)	W 3–2	5–4–0 (4–0–0)
*Non-conference game.
