= 1910–11 Dartmouth men's ice hockey season =

- Conference: T–4th IHA
- Home ice: Occom Pond

Record
- Overall: 4–6–0
- Conference: 1–4–0
- Home: 1–0–0
- Road: 2–5–0
- Neutral: 1–1–0

Coaches and captains
- Head coach: Ray Vye
- Captain: Frederick Eaton

The 1910–11 Dartmouth men's ice hockey season was the 6th season of play for the program.

== Season ==
On their third head coach in three years, Dartmouth began the season well but sputtered in their intercollegiate games and finished with a losing but improved record.

Note: Dartmouth College did not possess a moniker for its athletic teams until the 1920s, however, the university had adopted 'Dartmouth Green' as its school color in 1866.

== Roster ==
| No. | Nat. | Player | Class | Pos | Height | Weight | DoB | Hometown | Previous team |
|---|---|---|---|---|---|---|---|---|---|
| | | Gardner P. Bullard | Junior | D |
| | (United States) | Frederick C. Eaton (C) | Senior | F | | | | Auburndale, Massachusetts |
| | (United States) | Sargent F. Eaton | Senior | F | | | 1888-10-23 | Boston, Massachusetts |
| | (United States) | George Luhman | | D | | | | New Rochelle, New York |
| | (United States) | Edward B. Luitwieler | Sophomore | F | | | 1890-07-20 | Boston, Massachusetts |
| | (United States) | William H. Mason | Sophomore | F | | | | Concord, New Hampshire |
| | | Charles E. McCarthy | Junior | G |
| | (United States) | Rolf C. Norris | Senior | G | | | 1888-12-20 | Methuen, Massachusetts |
| | | Bradley M. Patten | Senior | F |
| | | Raymond M. Schulte | Sophomore | F |
| | (United States) | Carl L. Stucklen | Senior | | | | 1890-04-23 | Roxbury, Massachusetts |
| | (United States) | Henry Taylor | Freshman | G | | | 1890-12-07 | Brooklyn, New York |
| | (United States) | Carl S. Wells | Junior | F | | | 1890-02-04 | Natick, Massachusetts |

== Standings ==
1910–11 Collegiate ice hockey standings
| | Intercollegiate | | | | | | | Overall | | | | | |
| | GP | W | L | T | PCT. | GF | GA | GP | W | L | T | GF | GA |
|---|---|---|---|---|---|---|---|---|---|---|---|---|---|
| Amherst | – | – | – | – | – | – | – | 7 | 3 | 3 | 1 | – | – |
| Army | 4 | 1 | 3 | 0 | .250 | 6 | 7 | 4 | 1 | 3 | 0 | 6 | 7 |
| Case | – | – | – | – | – | – | – | – | – | – | – | – | – |
| Columbia | 7 | 4 | 3 | 0 | .571 | 22 | 19 | 7 | 4 | 3 | 0 | 22 | 19 |
| Cornell | 10 | 10 | 0 | 0 | 1.000 | 49 | 13 | 10 | 10 | 0 | 0 | 49 | 13 |
| Dartmouth | 7 | 2 | 5 | 0 | .286 | 17 | 33 | 10 | 4 | 6 | 0 | 28 | 43 |
| Harvard | 8 | 7 | 1 | 0 | .875 | 53 | 10 | 10 | 8 | 2 | 0 | 63 | 17 |
| Massachusetts Agricultural | 8 | 6 | 2 | 0 | .750 | 39 | 17 | 9 | 7 | 2 | 0 | 44 | 21 |
| MIT | 4 | 3 | 1 | 0 | .750 | 22 | 11 | 10 | 5 | 5 | 0 | 45 | 49 |
| Pennsylvania | 1 | 0 | 1 | 0 | .000 | 0 | 7 | 1 | 0 | 1 | 0 | 0 | 7 |
| Princeton | 10 | 5 | 5 | 0 | .500 | 31 | 31 | 10 | 5 | 5 | 0 | 31 | 31 |
| Rensselaer | 4 | 0 | 4 | 0 | .000 | 5 | 35 | 4 | 0 | 4 | 0 | 5 | 35 |
| Springfield Training | – | – | – | – | – | – | – | – | – | – | – | – | – |
| Stevens Tech | – | – | – | – | – | – | – | – | – | – | – | – | – |
| Trinity | – | – | – | – | – | – | – | – | – | – | – | – | – |
| Union | – | – | – | – | – | – | – | 1 | 1 | 0 | 0 | – | – |
| Western Reserve | – | – | – | – | – | – | – | – | – | – | – | – | – |
| Williams | 7 | 2 | 4 | 1 | .357 | 23 | 26 | 9 | 2 | 6 | 1 | 30 | 42 |
| Yale | 13 | 4 | 9 | 0 | .308 | 43 | 49 | 16 | 6 | 10 | 0 | 59 | 62 |

1910–11 Intercollegiate Hockey Association standings
| | Conference | | | | | | | Overall | | | | | |
| | GP | W | L | T | PTS | GF | GA | GP | W | L | T | GF | GA |
|---|---|---|---|---|---|---|---|---|---|---|---|---|---|
| Cornell * | 5 | 5 | 0 | 0 | 10 | 20 | 6 | 10 | 10 | 0 | 0 | 49 | 13 |
| Harvard | 5 | 4 | 1 | 0 | 8 | 27 | 7 | 10 | 8 | 2 | 0 | 63 | 17 |
| Columbia | 5 | 2 | 3 | 0 | 4 | 9 | 17 | 7 | 4 | 3 | 0 | 22 | 19 |
| Yale | 5 | 2 | 3 | 0 | 4 | 16 | 15 | 16 | 6 | 10 | 0 | 59 | 62 |
| Dartmouth | 5 | 1 | 4 | 0 | 2 | 12 | 30 | 10 | 4 | 6 | 0 | 28 | 43 |
| Princeton | 5 | 1 | 4 | 0 | 2 | 7 | 16 | 10 | 5 | 5 | 0 | 31 | 31 |
* indicates conference champion

== Schedule and results ==
| Date | Opponent | Site | Result | Record |
Regular Season
| December 26 | at Brae Burn Country Club* | Brae Burn Rink • Newton, Massachusetts | W 4–0 | 1–0–0 |
| December 28 | vs. Crescent Hockey Club* | Brae Burn Rink • Newton, Massachusetts | W 4–2 | 2–0–0 |
| December 30 | vs. Dartmouth Alumni* | Boston Arena • Boston, Massachusetts (Exhibition) | W 9–3 | |
| December 31 | at Boston Arena Club* | Boston Arena • Boston, Massachusetts | L 3–8 | 2–1–0 |
| January 2 | at MIT* | Boston Arena • Boston, Massachusetts | L 1–3 | 2–2–0 |
| January 14 | vs. Yale | Boston Arena • Boston, Massachusetts | L 2–7 | 2–3–0 (0–1–0) |
| January 18 | vs. Princeton | St. Nicholas Rink • New York, New York | W 6–3 | 3–3–0 (1–1–0) |
| January 20 | at Columbia | St. Nicholas Rink • New York, New York | L 2–3 | 3–4–0 (1–2–0) |
| February 4 | at Harvard | Boston Arena • Boston, Massachusetts | L 1–12 | 3–5–0 (1–3–0) |
| February 11 | Massachusetts Agricultural College* | Durham, New Hampshire | W 4–0 | 4–5–0 |
| February 18 | vs. Cornell | Boston Arena • Boston, Massachusetts | L 1–5 | 4–6–0 (1–4–0) |
*Non-conference game.
