= Frank Winters (ice hockey) =

American ice hockey player

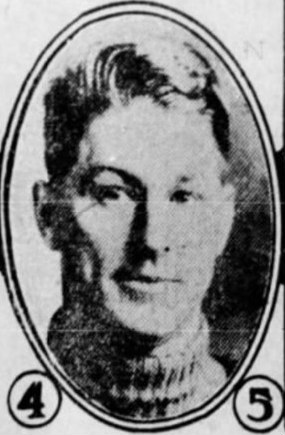
- Winters with Cleveland Indians in 1921–22
- Born: January 29, 1884 Duluth, Minnesota
- Died: November 17, 1944 (aged 60)
- Position: Defense
- Shot: Left
- Played for: Duluth A.C. (1903–1908); Cleveland A.C. (1908–1920); Cleveland Indians (1920–1924); Cleveland Blues (1924–25)
- Playing career: 1902–1925

Francis James "Coddy" Winters (January 29, 1884 – November 17, 1944) was an American ice hockey player from Duluth, Minnesota. Winters, a defenseman, played ice hockey mostly in the Cleveland, Ohio area, including with the Cleveland Indians in the USAHA. In 1920–21 Winters won the USAHA championship with the Cleveland Indians.

He was inducted into the United States Hockey Hall of Fame in 1973.

== 1915 Elysium Arena riot ==
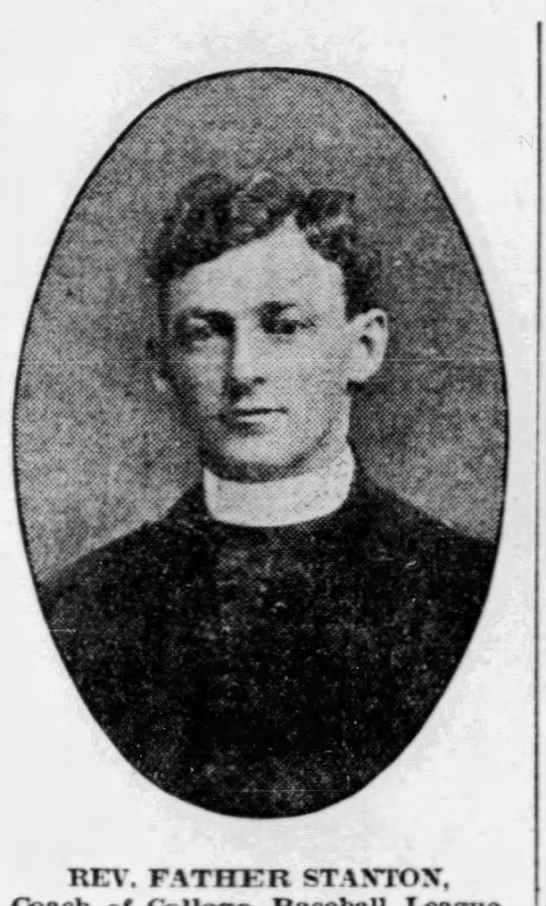
Father William Stanton.

On January 2, 1915, Coddy Winters was in the center of a riot at the conclusion of a game between the Cleveland Athletic Club and the visiting Ottawa College team, at the Elysium Arena in Cleveland, the third contest in a best-of-three series between the two teams. According to the Canadians the trouble started when Winters first threatened to "get" every one of the visiting players, and then also verbally abused their coach Father William Stanton with "the coarsest language", and that it later escalated into a full-scale riot when Cleveland player Elmer Irving threatened both the referee and the Ottawa players after having been penalized.

The Cleveland version on the other hand laid the blame on Ottawa player Jim Burnett, claiming the riot had started when Burnett slashed Winters across the nose with his stick. In the following melee Ottawa's goaltender Vincent Doran hit Elmer Irving over the head with his stick, after Irving had held down Ed Nagle, which left Irving with a fractured skull. Cleveland's trainer then took part in the melee and hit Ottawa player Redmond Quain over the head with a bottle. The spectators (a 2,000 crowd) then jumped onto the ice to join in, and the police had to be called upon to quell the disturbance, with a number of people getting hurt in the ensuing panic. Vincent Doran was arrested on a charge of assault to kill, for his attack on Irving, and his teammate Redmond Quain also appeared in a Cleveland police court as a witness against the Cleveland team's trainer. Doran was later dismissed by the police court when Irving refused to prosecute him.

"Ottawa College will not play again in Cleveland. The trouble is that Cleveland wants to win by any means. We had to put up with incompetent officials besides being victims of brutal attacks of the opposing team, which culminated during the final match in the disgraceful scene I have described."

— Father William Stanton on the Elysium Arena riot

== College Head Coaching Record ==
Record table
Season	Team	Overall	Conference	Standing	Postseason
Pennsylvania Quakers Independent (1922–1922)
1921–22	Pennsylvania	1–0–0 ^{†}			
Pennsylvania:		1–0–0			
Total:		1–0–0			
National champion Postseason invitational champion Conference regular season champion Conference regular season and conference tournament champion Division regular season champion Division regular season and conference tournament champion Conference tournament champion

† Winters joined the team mid-season for 1 game before the remainder of the team's schedule was cancelled.
