= 1907–08 Army Cadets men's ice hockey season =

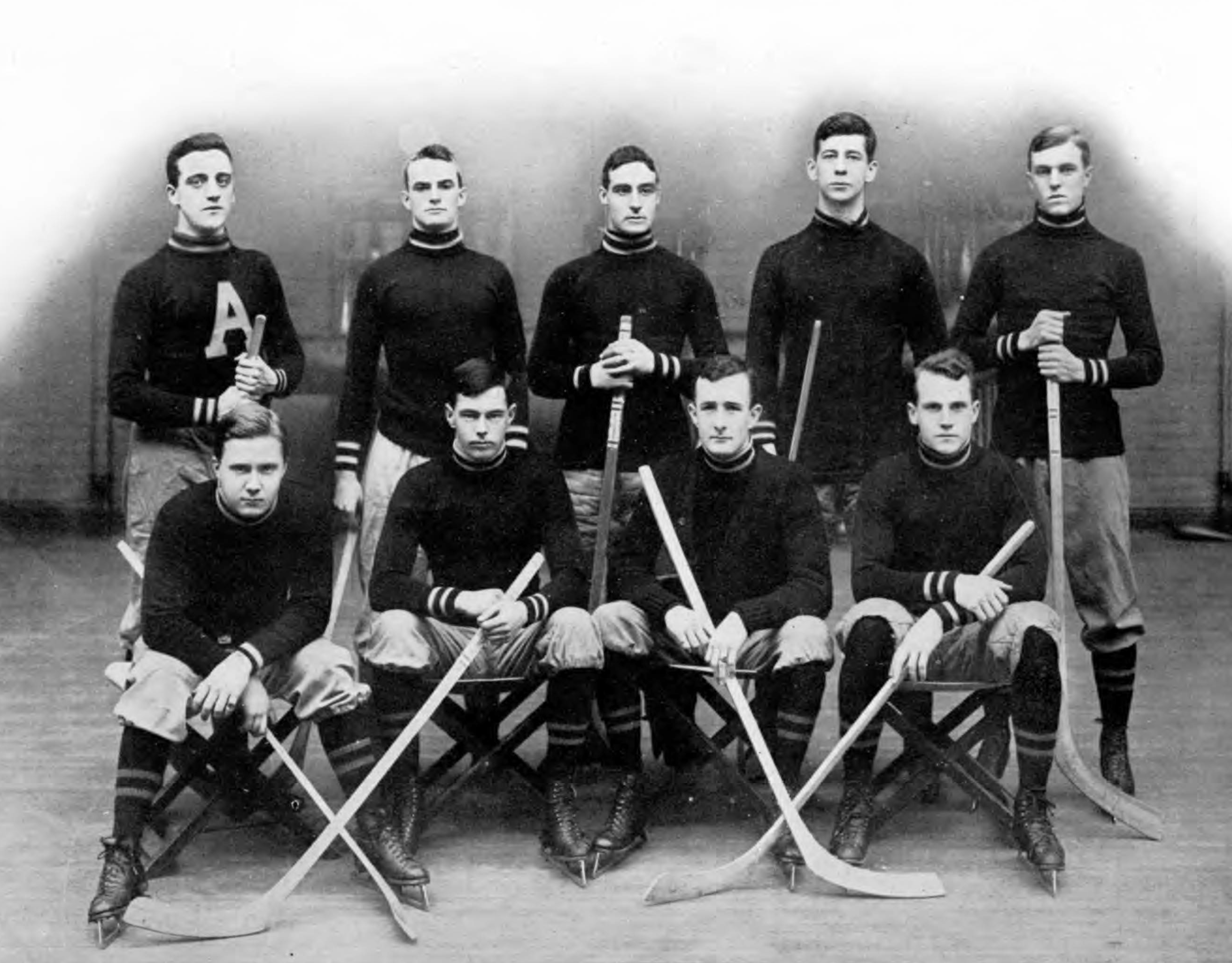
- Conference: Independent
- Home ice: Lusk Reservoir

Record
- Overall: 4–3–0

Coaches and captains
- Head coach: George Russell
- Captain: Philip Gordon

The 1907–08 Army Cadets men's ice hockey season was the 5th season of play for the program.

== Season ==
After three years under Capt. Robert Foy, Lt. George Russell took over as coach and the team responded with a vastly improved effort. The team allowed only 9 goals all season and finished with a winning record.

== Roster ==
No.	Nat.	Player	Class	Pos	Height	Weight	DoB	Hometown	Previous team
	(United States)	Philip Hayes	Junior	F			1887-06-16	Portage, Wisconsin
	(United States)	Philip Gordon (C)	Senior	F				New York

== Standings ==
1907–08 Collegiate ice hockey standings
	Intercollegiate							Overall					
	GP	W	L	T	PCT.	GF	GA	GP	W	L	T	GF	GA
Army	3	1	2	0	.333	7	4	7	4	3	0	18	9
Carnegie Tech	–	–	–	–	–	–	–	–	–	–	–	–	–
Columbia	4	1	3	0	.250	6	27	5	1	4	0	6	30
Cornell	3	3	0	0	1.000	16	0	4	4	0	0	21	0
Dartmouth	6	1	4	1	.250	15	34	7	1	5	1	15	37
Harvard	4	3	1	0	.750	32	9	9	7	2	0	55	17
MIT	6	4	2	0	.667	15	11	8	6	2	0	26	11
Princeton	5	2	3	0	.400	11	15	15	8	7	0	54	44
Rensselaer	5	2	2	1	.500	19	11	5	2	2	1	19	11
Rochester	–	–	–	–	–	–	–	–	–	–	–	–	–
Springfield Training	–	–	–	–	–	–	–	–	–	–	–	–	–
Trinity	–	–	–	–	–	–	–	–	–	–	–	–	–
Tufts	–	–	–	–	–	–	–	5	1	4	0	–	–
Union	–	–	–	–	–	–	–	3	1	2	0	–	–
Williams	3	3	0	0	1.000	32	6	4	4	0	0	48	6
Yale	5	5	0	0	1.000	35	11	9	5	4	0	41	34

== Schedule and results ==
Date	Opponent	Site	Result	Record
Regular Season
January 18	Cornell*	Lusk Reservoir • West Point, New York	L 0–2	0–1–0
	Albany High School*	Lusk Reservoir • West Point, New York	W 3–1	1–1–0
	Trinity*	Lusk Reservoir • West Point, New York	W 6–0	2–1–0
	Riverview Military Academy*	Lusk Reservoir • West Point, New York	W 5–1	3–1–0
February 8	MIT*	Lusk Reservoir • West Point, New York	L 1–2 ‡	3–2–0
	N.Y. National Guard 7th Regiment*	Lusk Reservoir • West Point, New York	W 1–0	4–2–0
	Pawling School*	Lusk Reservoir • West Point, New York	L 2–3	4–3–0
*Non-conference game.

‡ Army records the game 2–1 in their favor, however, contemporary news reports have the game being won by MIT.
