= 1910–11 MIT Engineers men's ice hockey season =

- Conference: Independent
- Home ice: Boston Arena

Record
- Overall: 5–5–0
- Road: 2–3–0
- Neutral: 2–1–0

Coaches and captains
- Captain: Richard Gould

The 1910–11 MIT Engineers men's ice hockey season was the 12th season of play for the program.

== Season ==
The Boston Arena served as the home arena for MIT this season.

The team did not have a head coach but Henry Stucklen served as team manager.

Note: Massachusetts Institute of Technology athletics were referred to as 'Engineers' or 'Techmen' during the first two decades of the 20th century. By 1920 all sports programs had adopted the Engineer moniker.

== Roster ==
No.	Nat.	Player	Class	Pos	Height	Weight	DoB	Hometown	Previous team
		Donald Bakewell	Junior	G
		Richard Gould (C)	Senior	D
		Frederick Hurlbutt	Freshman	F
		Alfred Ranney	Sophomore	D
		John Scoville	Senior	F
		Vernon Sloan	Junior	F
		Harold G. Storke	Freshman	F
		Henry Stucklen	Senior	F
		Arthur Vose	Junior	D
		Alexander W. Yereance	Junior	F

== Standings ==
1910–11 Collegiate ice hockey standings
	Intercollegiate							Overall					
	GP	W	L	T	PCT.	GF	GA	GP	W	L	T	GF	GA
Amherst	–	–	–	–	–	–	–	7	3	3	1	–	–
Army	4	1	3	0	.250	6	7	4	1	3	0	6	7
Case	–	–	–	–	–	–	–	–	–	–	–	–	–
Columbia	7	4	3	0	.571	22	19	7	4	3	0	22	19
Cornell	10	10	0	0	1.000	49	13	10	10	0	0	49	13
Dartmouth	7	2	5	0	.286	17	33	10	4	6	0	28	43
Harvard	8	7	1	0	.875	53	10	10	8	2	0	63	17
Massachusetts Agricultural	8	6	2	0	.750	39	17	9	7	2	0	44	21
MIT	4	3	1	0	.750	22	11	10	5	5	0	45	49
Pennsylvania	1	0	1	0	.000	0	7	1	0	1	0	0	7
Princeton	10	5	5	0	.500	31	31	10	5	5	0	31	31
Rensselaer	4	0	4	0	.000	5	35	4	0	4	0	5	35
Springfield Training	–	–	–	–	–	–	–	–	–	–	–	–	–
Stevens Tech	–	–	–	–	–	–	–	–	–	–	–	–	–
Trinity	–	–	–	–	–	–	–	–	–	–	–	–	–
Union	–	–	–	–	–	–	–	1	1	0	0	–	–
Western Reserve	–	–	–	–	–	–	–	–	–	–	–	–	–
Williams	7	2	4	1	.357	23	26	9	2	6	1	30	42
Yale	13	4	9	0	.308	43	49	16	6	10	0	59	62

== Schedule and results ==
Date	Opponent	Site	Result	Record
Regular Season
December 3	vs. Crescent Hockey Club*	Boston Arena • Boston, Massachusetts	W 7–6	1–0–0
December 7	vs. Boston Hockey Club*	Boston Arena • Boston, Massachusetts	L 0–8	1–1–0
December 14	vs. Harvard*	Boston Arena • Boston, Massachusetts	L 3–4	1–2–0
January 2	Dartmouth*	Boston Arena • Boston, Massachusetts	W 3–1	2–2–0
January 6	at Louden Field Club*	Empire Rink • Albany, New York	L 5–8	2–3–0
January 7	at Louden Field Club*	Empire Rink • Albany, New York	W 5–4	3–3–0
January 25	at Massachusetts Agricultural College*	Campus Pond • Amherst, Massachusetts	W 4–3	4–3–0
February 11	at Providence Hockey Club*	Eastside Rink • Providence, Rhode Island	L 2–6	4–4–0
February 16	Williams*	Boston Arena • Boston, Massachusetts	W 12–3	5–4–0
February 24	Halifax Crescents*	Boston Arena • Boston, Massachusetts	L 4–6	5–5–0
*Non-conference game.
