= 1907–08 Columbia men's ice hockey season =

- Conference: T–3rd IHA
- Home ice: St. Nicholas Rink

Record
- Overall: 1–4–0
- Conference: 1–3–0
- Home: 1–3–0
- Neutral: 0–1–0

Coaches and captains
- Head coach: Rudolph von Bernuth
- Captain: James Mackenzie

The 1907–08 Columbia men's ice hockey season was the 12th season of play for the program.

== Season ==
Former player Rudolph Von Bernuth acted as coach. R. P. Marshall served as team manager.

Note: Columbia University adopted the Lion as its mascot in 1910.

== Roster ==
No.	Nat.	Player	Class	Pos	Height	Weight	DoB	Hometown	Previous team
		Ray Barnum	Sophomore	D
		Albert Borchardt	Junior	D
		Jenkins		F
		H. Johnston	Graduate	F
		Clarence King	Senior	F
		Lloyd Kistler	Junior	F
		James Mackenzie (C)	Sophomore	F
		Robert Murphy	Sophomore	G
		Latham Reed	Senior	F
		George C. Shafer	Junior	F/R
		Benjamin Willis	Junior	G

== Standings ==
1907–08 Collegiate ice hockey standings
	Intercollegiate							Overall					
	GP	W	L	T	PCT.	GF	GA	GP	W	L	T	GF	GA
Army	3	1	2	0	.333	7	4	7	4	3	0	18	9
Carnegie Tech	–	–	–	–	–	–	–	–	–	–	–	–	–
Columbia	4	1	3	0	.250	6	27	5	1	4	0	6	30
Cornell	3	3	0	0	1.000	16	0	4	4	0	0	21	0
Dartmouth	6	1	4	1	.250	15	34	7	1	5	1	15	37
Harvard	4	3	1	0	.750	32	9	9	7	2	0	55	17
MIT	6	4	2	0	.667	15	11	8	6	2	0	26	11
Princeton	5	2	3	0	.400	11	15	15	8	7	0	54	44
Rensselaer	5	2	2	1	.500	19	11	5	2	2	1	19	11
Rochester	–	–	–	–	–	–	–	–	–	–	–	–	–
Springfield Training	–	–	–	–	–	–	–	–	–	–	–	–	–
Trinity	–	–	–	–	–	–	–	–	–	–	–	–	–
Tufts	–	–	–	–	–	–	–	5	1	4	0	–	–
Union	–	–	–	–	–	–	–	3	1	2	0	–	–
Williams	3	3	0	0	1.000	32	6	4	4	0	0	48	6
Yale	5	5	0	0	1.000	35	11	9	5	4	0	41	34

1907–08 Intercollegiate Hockey Association standings
	Conference							Overall					
	GP	W	L	T	PTS	GF	GA	GP	W	L	T	GF	GA
Yale *	4	4	0	0	8	28	10	9	5	4	0	41	34
Harvard	4	3	1	0	6	32	9	9	7	2	0	55	17
Princeton	4	1	3	0	2	9	15	15	8	7	0	54	44
Dartmouth	4	1	3	0	2	11	25	7	1	5	1	15	37
Columbia	4	1	3	0	2	6	27	5	1	4	0	6	30
* indicates conference champion

== Schedule and results ==
Date	Opponent	Site	Result	Record
Regular Season
December 12	vs. New York Hockey Club*	St. Nicholas Rink • New York, New York	L 0–3	0–1–0
January 4	Princeton	St. Nicholas Rink • New York, New York	L 0–1	0–2–0 (0–1–0)
January 11	Harvard	St. Nicholas Rink • New York, New York	L 1–14	0–3–0 (0–2–0)
January 16	Dartmouth	St. Nicholas Rink • New York, New York	W 4–2	1–3–0 (1–2–0)
January 24	Yale	St. Nicholas Rink • New York, New York	L 1–10	1–4–0 (1–3–0)
*Non-conference game.
