= 1907–08 Harvard Crimson men's ice hockey season =

College ice hockey season

- Conference: 2nd IHA
- Home ice: Harvard Stadium Rink

Record
- Overall: 7–2–0
- Conference: 3–1–0
- Home: 3–0–0
- Road: 2–1–0
- Neutral: 2–1–0

Coaches and captains
- Head coach: Alfred Winsor
- Captain: Clarence Pell

The 1907–08 Harvard Crimson men's ice hockey season was the 11th season of play for the program.

== Season ==
For the second consecutive season Harvard finished second in the Intercollegiate Hockey Association, losing their only conference game to league champion Yale. The match was the first victory for the Bulldogs over the Crimson in nearly six years.

== Roster ==
No.	Nat.	Player	Class	Pos	Height	Weight	DoB	Hometown	Previous team
	(United States)	Templeton Briggs	Junior	F			1887-02-09	Chestnut Hill, Massachusetts
	(United States)	Shirley Ford	Junior	D			1887-03-09	Sun River, Montana
	(United States)	George Gardner	Sophomore	F			1888-01-28	Boston, Massachusetts
	(United States)	S. Trafford Hicks	Sophomore	F			1888-04-04	Arlington, Massachusetts
	(United States)	Morton Newhall	Senior	F			1886-09-15	Germantown, Pennsylvania
		John Paine	Junior	F
	(United States)	Clarence Pell (C)	Senior	F			1885-07-29	Newport, Rhode Island
	(United States)	Laurence Rumsey Jr.	Senior	F			1885-09-02	Buffalo, New York
	(United States)	Thompson Sampson	Junior	D			1886-04-23	Boston, Massachusetts
	(United States)	Frank Washburn	Junior	G			1887-12-04	New York, New York
	(United States)	Joseph Willetts	Junior	D			1886-10-17	Brooklyn, New York

== Standings ==
1907–08 Collegiate ice hockey standings
	Intercollegiate							Overall					
	GP	W	L	T	PCT.	GF	GA	GP	W	L	T	GF	GA
Army	3	1	2	0	.333	7	4	7	4	3	0	18	9
Carnegie Tech	–	–	–	–	–	–	–	–	–	–	–	–	–
Columbia	4	1	3	0	.250	6	27	5	1	4	0	6	30
Cornell	3	3	0	0	1.000	16	0	4	4	0	0	21	0
Dartmouth	6	1	4	1	.250	15	34	7	1	5	1	15	37
Harvard	4	3	1	0	.750	32	9	9	7	2	0	55	17
MIT	6	4	2	0	.667	15	11	8	6	2	0	26	11
Princeton	5	2	3	0	.400	11	15	15	8	7	0	54	44
Rensselaer	5	2	2	1	.500	19	11	5	2	2	1	19	11
Rochester	–	–	–	–	–	–	–	–	–	–	–	–	–
Springfield Training	–	–	–	–	–	–	–	–	–	–	–	–	–
Trinity	–	–	–	–	–	–	–	–	–	–	–	–	–
Tufts	–	–	–	–	–	–	–	5	1	4	0	–	–
Union	–	–	–	–	–	–	–	3	1	2	0	–	–
Williams	3	3	0	0	1.000	32	6	4	4	0	0	48	6
Yale	5	5	0	0	1.000	35	11	9	5	4	0	41	34

1907–08 Intercollegiate Hockey Association standings
	Conference							Overall					
	GP	W	L	T	PTS	GF	GA	GP	W	L	T	GF	GA
Yale *	4	4	0	0	8	28	10	9	5	4	0	41	34
Harvard	4	3	1	0	6	32	9	9	7	2	0	55	17
Princeton	4	1	3	0	2	9	15	15	8	7	0	54	44
Dartmouth	4	1	3	0	2	11	25	7	1	5	1	15	37
Columbia	4	1	3	0	2	6	27	5	1	4	0	6	30
* indicates conference champion

== Schedule and results ==
Date	Opponent	Site	Result	Record
Regular Season
January 11	at Columbia	St. Nicholas Rink • New York, New York	W 14–1	1–0–0 (1–0–0)
January 18	vs. Princeton	St. Nicholas Rink • New York, New York	W 6–2	2–0–0 (2–0–0)
January 22	vs. Bishop's*	Concord, New Hampshire	W 4–0	3–0–0
January 25	McGill*	Harvard Stadium Rink • Cambridge, Massachusetts	W 8–2	4–0–0
February 5	Phillips Academy*	Harvard Stadium Rink • Cambridge, Massachusetts	W 6–0	5–0–0
February 8	Dartmouth	Harvard Stadium Rink • Cambridge, Massachusetts	W 10–3	6–0–0 (3–0–0)
February 11	at St. Paul's School*	Concord, New Hampshire	L 3–5	6–1–0
February 14	at New York Hockey Club*	St. Nicholas Rink • New York, New York	W 2–1	7–1–0
February 15	vs. Yale	St. Nicholas Rink • New York, New York (Rivalry)	L 2–3	7–2–0 (3–1–0)
*Non-conference game.
