= 1910–11 Massachusetts Agricultural Aggies men's ice hockey season =

- Home ice: Campus Pond

Record
- Overall: 7–2–0
- Home: 3–1–0
- Road: 4–1–0

Coaches and captains
- Captain: James Adams

The 1910–11 Massachusetts Agricultural Aggies men's ice hockey season was the 3rd season of play for the program.

== Season ==
Mass Agg continued to improve in the standings, rising to 7 wins in their junior year and winning their first game against a major program (Yale).

== Roster ==
No.	Nat.	Player	Class	Pos	Height	Weight	DoB	Hometown	Previous team
		Arthur J. Ackerman	Junior
		James Adams (C)
		John G. Hutchinson	Freshman
		Dettmar W. Jones	Freshman
		Lester W. Needham	Freshman
		Curtis Peckham	Junior
		Harold C. Woolley	Freshman

== Standings ==
1910–11 Collegiate ice hockey standings
	Intercollegiate							Overall					
	GP	W	L	T	PCT.	GF	GA	GP	W	L	T	GF	GA
Amherst	–	–	–	–	–	–	–	7	3	3	1	–	–
Army	4	1	3	0	.250	6	7	4	1	3	0	6	7
Case	–	–	–	–	–	–	–	–	–	–	–	–	–
Columbia	7	4	3	0	.571	22	19	7	4	3	0	22	19
Cornell	10	10	0	0	1.000	49	13	10	10	0	0	49	13
Dartmouth	7	2	5	0	.286	17	33	10	4	6	0	28	43
Harvard	8	7	1	0	.875	53	10	10	8	2	0	63	17
Massachusetts Agricultural	8	6	2	0	.750	39	17	9	7	2	0	44	21
MIT	4	3	1	0	.750	22	11	10	5	5	0	45	49
Pennsylvania	1	0	1	0	.000	0	7	1	0	1	0	0	7
Princeton	10	5	5	0	.500	31	31	10	5	5	0	31	31
Rensselaer	4	0	4	0	.000	5	35	4	0	4	0	5	35
Springfield Training	–	–	–	–	–	–	–	–	–	–	–	–	–
Stevens Tech	–	–	–	–	–	–	–	–	–	–	–	–	–
Trinity	–	–	–	–	–	–	–	–	–	–	–	–	–
Union	–	–	–	–	–	–	–	1	1	0	0	–	–
Western Reserve	–	–	–	–	–	–	–	–	–	–	–	–	–
Williams	7	2	4	1	.357	23	26	9	2	6	1	30	42
Yale	13	4	9	0	.308	43	49	16	6	10	0	59	62

== Schedule and results ==
Date	Opponent	Site	Result	Record
Regular Season
December 10	at Williams*	Weston Field Rink • Williamstown, Massachusetts	W 6–3	1–0–0
December 15	Springfield Training*	Campus Pond • Amherst, Massachusetts	W 6–2	2–0–0
January 7	at Trinity*	Hartford, Connecticut	W 6–2	3–0–0
January 20	at Rensselaer*	Empire Rink • Albany, New York	W 13–1	4–0–0
January 21	at Louden Field Club*	Campus Pond • Amherst, Massachusetts	W 5–4	5–0–0
January 26	MIT*	Campus Pond • Amherst, Massachusetts	L 3–4	5–1–0
February 3	at Yale*	New Haven, Connecticut	W 4–1	6–1–0
February 11	at Dartmouth*	Occom Pond • Durham, New Hampshire	L 0–4	6–2–0
January 14	Amherst*	Campus Pond • Amherst, Massachusetts	W 1–0	7–2–0
*Non-conference game.
