= Talbot Hunter =

Canadian sports coach (1884–1928)

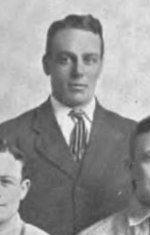
- Hunter in 1909–10

Biographical details
- Born: October 9, 1884; Toronto, Ontario, Canada
- Died: November 9, 1928 (aged 44); Welland, Ontario, Canada

Coaching career (HC unless noted)

Hockey
- 1909–1912: Cornell
- 1914–1916: Cornell
- 1919–1920: Yale
- 1921–1923: Army

Lacrosse
- 1915–1916: Cornell
- 1919–1920: Yale
- 1921–1923: Army
- 1927–1928: Harvard

Soccer
- 1914–1915: Cornell
- 1919–1920: Yale

Accomplishments and honors

Championships
- 1911 intercollegiate ice hockey championship; 1923 USILA national championship

Talbot Talmage Hunter (October 9, 1884 – November 9, 1928) was a Canadian college hockey, lacrosse, and soccer coach. He served as a coach at Cornell University, Yale University, the United States Military Academy at West Point, and Harvard University.

== Biography ==
Hunter was a native of Toronto, Ontario, and attended the University of Toronto. He coached the Cornell University ice hockey from the 1909–10 season through the 1911–12 season. He led the Big Red to the 1912 intercollegiate hockey championship.

In 1914, Hunter returned to Cornell to take over the soccer team, and later, the hockey team. In 1915, his responsibilities were increased to include those of head coach for the lacrosse team, of which he was the first non-student-coach. Hunter coached the lacrosse team for two seasons and amassed a 7–8–1 record. Hunter was the first person to coach all three sports at Cornell. His Cornell soccer teams compiled a 2–5–5 record over his two seasons, and his hockey teams amassed a 20–15–0 record.

In 1919, he was hired as head coach of the Yale University hockey, lacrosse, and soccer teams.

Hunter coached the Army lacrosse team from 1921 to 1923, and compiled a 16–5–1 record. In 1923, he led Army to an 8–1–1 record and its first national championship in lacrosse. He coached the hockey team from 1921 to 1923 and compiled a 12–12–2 record.

Hunter served as the head coach for the Harvard University lacrosse team in 1927 and amassed a 3–8 record. He began 1928 as coach, but fell ill midway through the season and was replaced by H. W. Jeffers.

== Head coaching record ==
=== Ice hockey ===
Record table
| Season | Team | Overall | Conference | Standing | Postseason |
|---|---|---|---|---|---|
Cornell Big Red (IHA) (1909–1912)
| 1909–10 | Cornell | 3–4–0 | 2–2–0 | 3rd | |
| 1910–11 | Cornell | 10–0–0 | 5–0–0 | 1st | Intercollegiate Champion |
| 1911–12 | Cornell | 5–7–0 | 1–3–0 | 4th | |
| Cornell: | | 18–11–0 | 8–5–0 | | |
Cornell Big Red Independent (1914–1916)
| 1914–15 | Cornell | 1–3–0 | | | |
| 1915–16 | Cornell | 1–1–0 | | | |
| Cornell: | | 2–4–0 | | | |
Yale Bulldogs (THL) (1919–1920)
| 1919–20 | Yale | 4–5–0 | 2–2–0 | 2nd | |
| Yale: | | 4–5–0 | | | |
Army Cadets Independent (1920–1923)
| 1920–21 | Army | 0–2–1 | | | |
| 1921–22 | Army | 5–3–1 | | | |
| 1922–23 | Army | 7–7–0 | | | |
| Army: | | 12–12–2 | | | |
| Total: | | 36–32–2 | | | |
National champion Postseason invitational champion Conference regular season champion Conference regular season and conference tournament champion Division regular season champion Division regular season and conference tournament champion Conference tournament champion
