= 1910–11 Army Cadets men's ice hockey season =

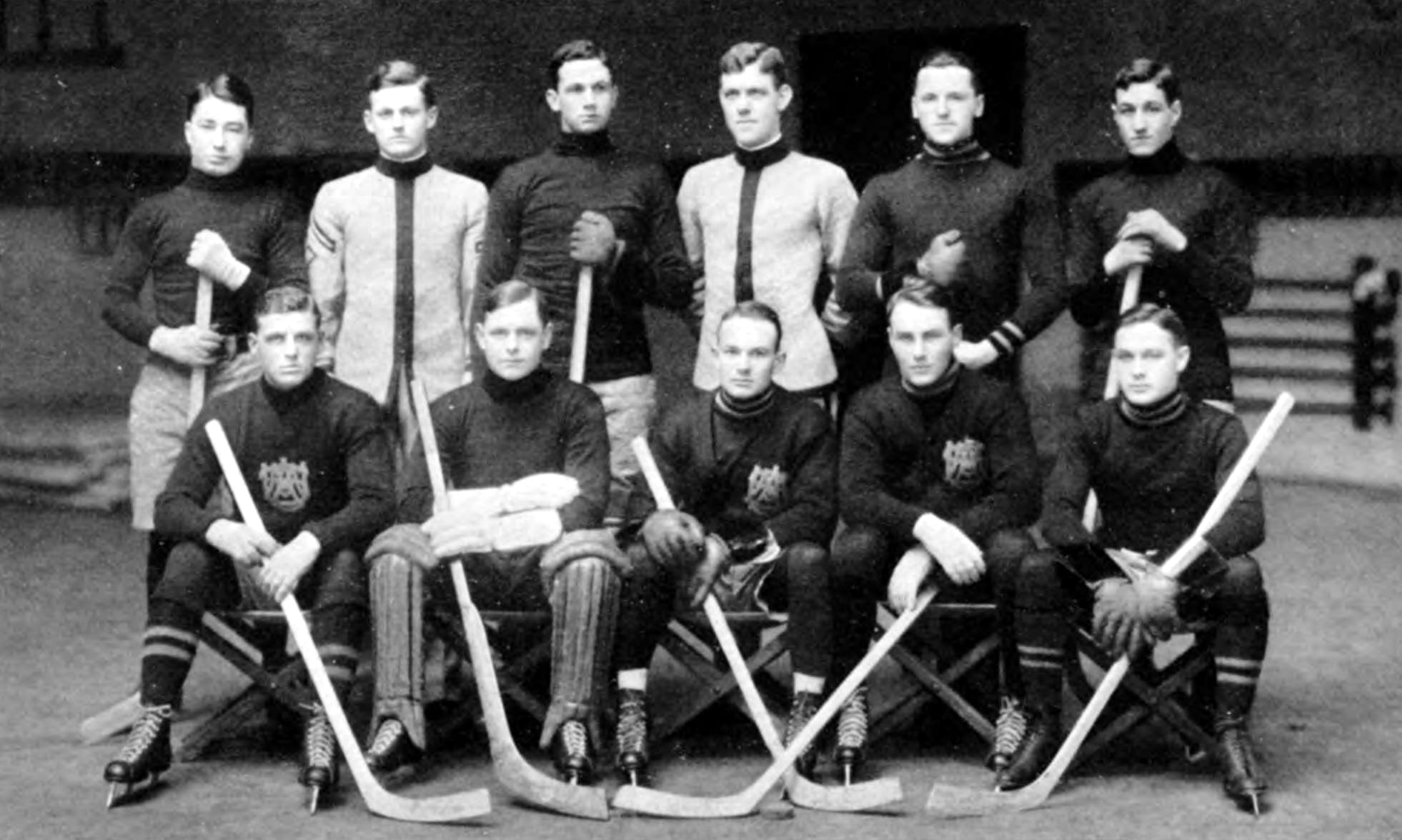
- Conference: Independent
- Home ice: Lusk Reservoir

Record
- Overall: 1–3–0

Coaches and captains
- Head coach: Leroy Bartlett
- Captain: Millard Harmon

The 1910–11 Army Cadets men's ice hockey season was the 8th season of play for the program.

== Season ==
Former team captain Lt. Leroy Bartlett served as coach for the team. In his first game behind the bench the Cadets earned their first win in almost three years. The succeeding three games were all close affairs but Army could not summon enough offense to overcome their opponents and the team finished the season on a three game losing streak.

== Roster ==
No.	Nat.	Player	Class	Pos	Height	Weight	DoB	Hometown	Previous team
	(United States)	Millard Harmon Jr. (C)	Junior	R			1888-01-19	Fort Mason, California

== Standings ==
1910–11 Collegiate ice hockey standings
	Intercollegiate							Overall					
	GP	W	L	T	PCT.	GF	GA	GP	W	L	T	GF	GA
Amherst	–	–	–	–	–	–	–	7	3	3	1	–	–
Army	4	1	3	0	.250	6	7	4	1	3	0	6	7
Case	–	–	–	–	–	–	–	–	–	–	–	–	–
Columbia	7	4	3	0	.571	22	19	7	4	3	0	22	19
Cornell	10	10	0	0	1.000	49	13	10	10	0	0	49	13
Dartmouth	7	2	5	0	.286	17	33	10	4	6	0	28	43
Harvard	8	7	1	0	.875	53	10	10	8	2	0	63	17
Massachusetts Agricultural	8	6	2	0	.750	39	17	9	7	2	0	44	21
MIT	4	3	1	0	.750	22	11	10	5	5	0	45	49
Pennsylvania	1	0	1	0	.000	0	7	1	0	1	0	0	7
Princeton	10	5	5	0	.500	31	31	10	5	5	0	31	31
Rensselaer	4	0	4	0	.000	5	35	4	0	4	0	5	35
Springfield Training	–	–	–	–	–	–	–	–	–	–	–	–	–
Stevens Tech	–	–	–	–	–	–	–	–	–	–	–	–	–
Trinity	–	–	–	–	–	–	–	–	–	–	–	–	–
Union	–	–	–	–	–	–	–	1	1	0	0	–	–
Western Reserve	–	–	–	–	–	–	–	–	–	–	–	–	–
Williams	7	2	4	1	.357	23	26	9	2	6	1	30	42
Yale	13	4	9	0	.308	43	49	16	6	10	0	59	62

== Schedule and results ==
Date	Opponent	Site	Result	Record
Regular Season
	Stevens Tech*	Lusk Reservoir • West Point, New York	W 3–0	1–0–0
	Amherst*	Lusk Reservoir • West Point, New York	L 0–2	1–1–0
	Springfield Training*	Lusk Reservoir • West Point, New York	L 1–2	1–2–0
February 22	Williams*	Lusk Reservoir • West Point, New York	L 2–3	1–3–0
*Non-conference game.
