= 1907–08 United States collegiate men's ice hockey season =

- Duration: December 1907– February 1908
- Collegiate champion: Yale

The 1907–08 United States collegiate men's ice hockey season was the 14th season of collegiate ice hockey.

== Regular season ==
=== Standings ===
1907–08 Collegiate ice hockey standings
	Intercollegiate							Overall					
	GP	W	L	T	PCT.	GF	GA	GP	W	L	T	GF	GA
Army	3	1	2	0	.333	7	4	7	4	3	0	18	9
Carnegie Tech	–	–	–	–	–	–	–	–	–	–	–	–	–
Columbia	4	1	3	0	.250	6	27	5	1	4	0	6	30
Cornell	3	3	0	0	1.000	16	0	4	4	0	0	21	0
Dartmouth	6	1	4	1	.250	15	34	7	1	5	1	15	37
Harvard	4	3	1	0	.750	32	9	9	7	2	0	55	17
MIT	6	4	2	0	.667	15	11	8	6	2	0	26	11
Princeton	5	2	3	0	.400	11	15	15	8	7	0	54	44
Rensselaer	5	2	2	1	.500	19	11	5	2	2	1	19	11
Rochester	–	–	–	–	–	–	–	–	–	–	–	–	–
Springfield Training	–	–	–	–	–	–	–	–	–	–	–	–	–
Trinity	–	–	–	–	–	–	–	–	–	–	–	–	–
Tufts	–	–	–	–	–	–	–	5	1	4	0	–	–
Union	–	–	–	–	–	–	–	3	1	2	0	–	–
Williams	3	3	0	0	1.000	32	6	4	4	0	0	48	6
Yale	5	5	0	0	1.000	35	11	9	5	4	0	41	34

1907–08 Intercollegiate Hockey Association standings
	Conference							Overall					
	GP	W	L	T	PTS	GF	GA	GP	W	L	T	GF	GA
Yale *	4	4	0	0	8	28	10	9	5	4	0	41	34
Harvard	4	3	1	0	6	32	9	9	7	2	0	55	17
Princeton	4	1	3	0	2	9	15	15	8	7	0	54	44
Dartmouth	4	1	3	0	2	11	25	7	1	5	1	15	37
Columbia	4	1	3	0	2	6	27	5	1	4	0	6	30
* indicates conference champion
