= 1910–11 Yale Bulldogs men's ice hockey season =

16th season of Yale Bulldogs ice hockey from 1910 to 1911

- Conference: T–3rd IHA

Record
- Overall: 6–10–0
- Conference: 2–3–0
- Home: 4–3–0
- Neutral: 2–7–0

Coaches and captains
- Captain: Louis Loutrel

The 1910–11 Yale Bulldogs men's ice hockey season was the 16th season of play for the program.

== Season ==
For the second time in three years Yale finished the season 4 games below .500. They did, however, lose four games to undefeated intercollegiate champion Cornell.

The team did not have a coach, however, C. Lawson Reed served as team manager.

== Roster ==
No.	Nat.	Player	Class	Pos	Height	Weight	DoB	Hometown	Previous team
	(United States)	Springer H. Brooks	Senior	D			1890-04-11	Saint Paul, Minnesota
	(United States)	Harold W. Carhart	Junior	G			1890-01-28	Brooklyn, New York
		Walton Cox	Sophomore	F			1890-12-20
		Archer Harman	Sophomore	F			1889-10-11
		Arthur Howe	Junior
	(United States)	Louis F. Loutrel (C)	Senior	F			1890-06-15
		Henry Merritt	Junior	F
	(United States)	Svante Swenson	Junior	D			1890-05-10	Manhattan, New York
	(United States)	Thornton C. Thayer	Sophomore	G			1890-06-25

== Standings ==
1910–11 Collegiate ice hockey standings
	Intercollegiate							Overall					
	GP	W	L	T	PCT.	GF	GA	GP	W	L	T	GF	GA
Amherst	–	–	–	–	–	–	–	7	3	3	1	–	–
Army	4	1	3	0	.250	6	7	4	1	3	0	6	7
Case	–	–	–	–	–	–	–	–	–	–	–	–	–
Columbia	7	4	3	0	.571	22	19	7	4	3	0	22	19
Cornell	10	10	0	0	1.000	49	13	10	10	0	0	49	13
Dartmouth	7	2	5	0	.286	17	33	10	4	6	0	28	43
Harvard	8	7	1	0	.875	53	10	10	8	2	0	63	17
Massachusetts Agricultural	8	6	2	0	.750	39	17	9	7	2	0	44	21
MIT	4	3	1	0	.750	22	11	10	5	5	0	45	49
Pennsylvania	1	0	1	0	.000	0	7	1	0	1	0	0	7
Princeton	10	5	5	0	.500	31	31	10	5	5	0	31	31
Rensselaer	4	0	4	0	.000	5	35	4	0	4	0	5	35
Springfield Training	–	–	–	–	–	–	–	–	–	–	–	–	–
Stevens Tech	–	–	–	–	–	–	–	–	–	–	–	–	–
Trinity	–	–	–	–	–	–	–	–	–	–	–	–	–
Union	–	–	–	–	–	–	–	1	1	0	0	–	–
Western Reserve	–	–	–	–	–	–	–	–	–	–	–	–	–
Williams	7	2	4	1	.357	23	26	9	2	6	1	30	42
Yale	13	4	9	0	.308	43	49	16	6	10	0	59	62

1910–11 Intercollegiate Hockey Association standings
	Conference							Overall					
	GP	W	L	T	PTS	GF	GA	GP	W	L	T	GF	GA
Cornell *	5	5	0	0	10	20	6	10	10	0	0	49	13
Harvard	5	4	1	0	8	27	7	10	8	2	0	63	17
Columbia	5	2	3	0	4	9	17	7	4	3	0	22	19
Yale	5	2	3	0	4	16	15	16	6	10	0	59	62
Dartmouth	5	1	4	0	2	12	30	10	4	6	0	28	43
Princeton	5	1	4	0	2	7	16	10	5	5	0	31	31
* indicates conference champion

== Schedule and results ==
Date	Opponent	Site	Result	Record
Regular season
December 10	vs. Brooklyn Crescents*	St. Nicholas Rink • New York, New York	L 3–7	0–1–0
December 21	vs. St. Paul's School*	St. Nicholas Rink • New York, New York	W 9–3	1–1–0
December 27	vs. Princeton*	Boston Arena • Boston, Massachusetts	L 4–5	1–2–0
December 28	vs. Princeton*	Boston Arena • Boston, Massachusetts	W 6–5	2–2–0
December 29	vs. Princeton*	Boston Arena • Boston, Massachusetts	L 3–4	2–3–0
December 30	vs. Cornell*	Chicago Ice Palace • Chicago, Illinois	L 3–4	2–4–0
December 31	vs. Cornell*	Chicago Ice Palace • Chicago, Illinois	L 1–3	2–5–0
January 2	vs. Cornell*	Chicago Ice Palace • Chicago, Illinois	L 2–4	2–6–0
January 11	at Columbia	St. Nicholas Rink • New York, New York	L 4–6 ^{OT}	2–7–0 (0–1–0)
January 14	vs. Dartmouth	Boston Arena • Boston, Massachusetts	W 7–2	3–7–0 (1–1–0)
January 21	vs. Cornell	St. Nicholas Rink • New York, New York	L 2–4	3–8–0 (1–2–0)
January 28	vs. Princeton	St. Nicholas Rink • New York, New York	W 1–0	4–8–0 (2–2–0)
February 3	vs. Louden Field Club*	Empire Rink • Albany, New York	W 4–3	5–8–0
February 4	Springfield Training*	New Haven, Connecticut	W 7–3	6–8–0
February 5	Massachusetts Agricultural College*	New Haven, Connecticut	L 1–6	6–9–0
February 18	vs. Harvard	St. Nicholas Rink • New York, New York (Rivalry)	L 2–3	6–10–0 (2–3–0)
*Non-conference game.
