= Cleveland Indians (IHL) =

- City: Cleveland, Ohio
- League: International Hockey League
- Operated: 1929 to 1934
- Home arena: Elysium Arena

Franchise history
- 1927–1929: Kitchener Dutchmen
- 1929–1934: Cleveland Indians
- 1934–1937: Cleveland Falcons
- 1937–1973: Cleveland Barons
- 1973–1974: Jacksonville Barons
- 1974–1975: Syracuse Eagles

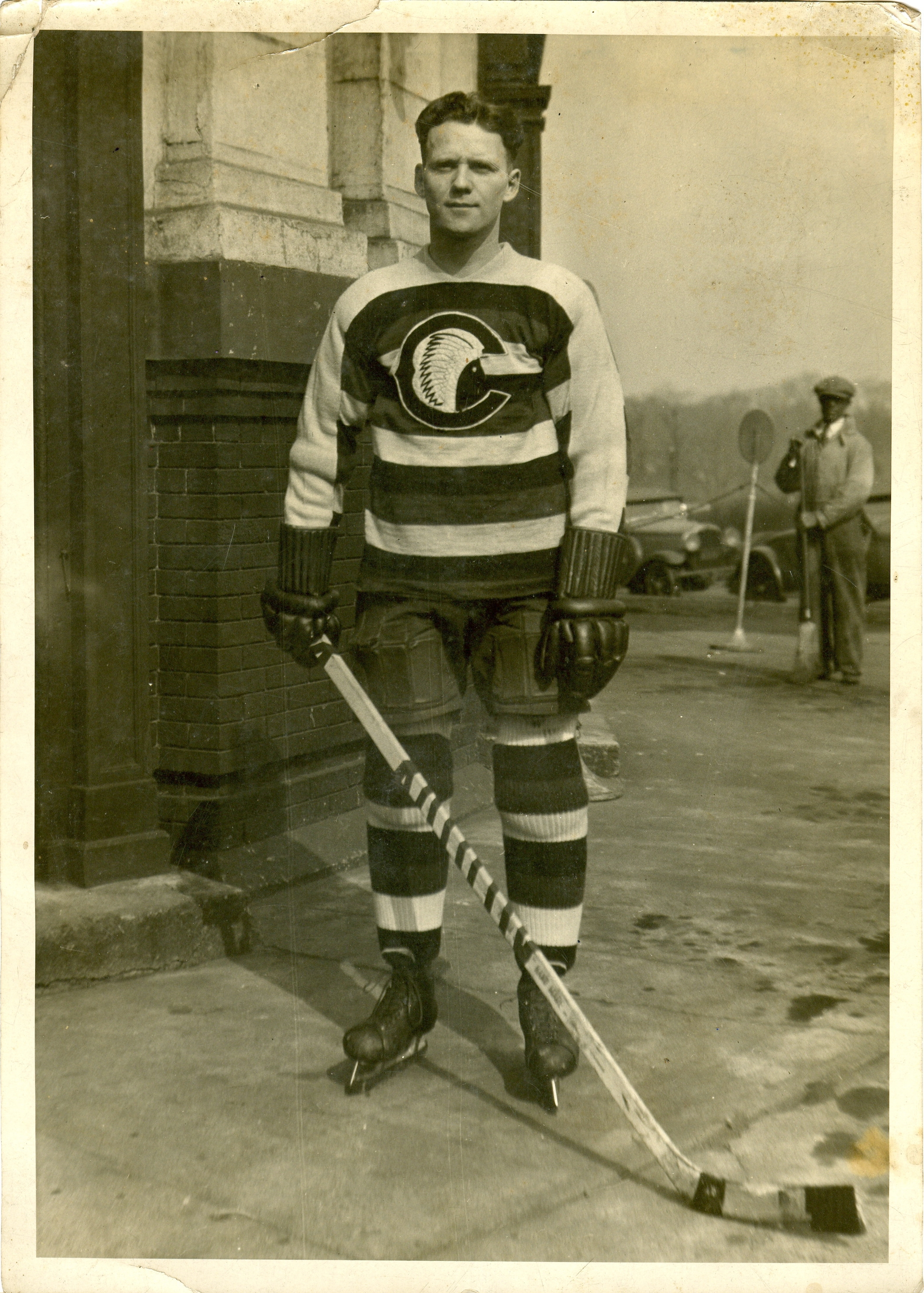
Mickey McGuire with the Cleveland Indians in 1929.

The Cleveland Indians were a professional ice hockey team in Cleveland, Ohio, that played home games in the Elysium Arena.

== History ==
In 1929, the Kitchener Dutchmen International Hockey League (IHL) franchise was transferred to Cleveland. In the summer of 1934, the team was renamed the Cleveland Falcons, and under that name became a charter member of the International-American Hockey League (now American Hockey League). Subsequently, the team was renamed the Cleveland Barons for the 1937–38 season, a name they kept until 1973, when they relocated and became the Jacksonville Barons midseason. The franchise folded after the 1974–75 season, following one season as the Syracuse Eagles.
