= 1907–08 Dartmouth men's ice hockey season =

- Conference: T–3rd IHA
- Home ice: Occom Pond

Record
- Overall: 1–5–1
- Conference: 1–3–0
- Home: 0–1–0
- Road: 0–2–1
- Neutral: 1–2–0

Coaches and captains
- Captain: Warren Foote

The 1907–08 Dartmouth men's ice hockey season was the 3rd season of play for the program.

== Season ==
With only one of the four founders of the program left (Warren Foote) the hockey team wasn't able to sustain the success they found in their second season and finished with a 1–5–1 record.

Note: Dartmouth College did not possess a moniker for its athletic teams until the 1920s, however, the university had adopted 'Dartmouth Green' as its school color in 1866.

== Roster ==
No.	Nat.	Player	Class	Pos	Height	Weight	DoB	Hometown	Previous team
	(United States)	Harry M. Bicknell	Freshman				1885-06-04	Malone, New York
		David R. Blanpied	Senior	G
	(United States)	Gardner P. Bullard	Freshman	D			1889-09-02	Massachusetts
		Arthur F. Doe	Junior	F
		James R. Erwin	Freshman
		Emile H. Erhard	Junior	G
	(United States)	Warren C. Foote (C)	Senior	F				Newton Center, Massachusetts
	(United States)	Stanley W. Leighton	Junior	D				Boston, Massachusetts
	(United States)	Ralph H. Marston	Junior	F				Roxbury, Massachusetts
	(United States)	Russell A. Pettengill	Junior	D			1888-02-27	Melrose, Massachusetts

== Standings ==
1907–08 Collegiate ice hockey standings
	Intercollegiate							Overall					
	GP	W	L	T	PCT.	GF	GA	GP	W	L	T	GF	GA
Army	3	1	2	0	.333	7	4	7	4	3	0	18	9
Carnegie Tech	–	–	–	–	–	–	–	–	–	–	–	–	–
Columbia	4	1	3	0	.250	6	27	5	1	4	0	6	30
Cornell	3	3	0	0	1.000	16	0	4	4	0	0	21	0
Dartmouth	6	1	4	1	.250	15	34	7	1	5	1	15	37
Harvard	4	3	1	0	.750	32	9	9	7	2	0	55	17
MIT	6	4	2	0	.667	15	11	8	6	2	0	26	11
Princeton	5	2	3	0	.400	11	15	15	8	7	0	54	44
Rensselaer	5	2	2	1	.500	19	11	5	2	2	1	19	11
Rochester	–	–	–	–	–	–	–	–	–	–	–	–	–
Springfield Training	–	–	–	–	–	–	–	–	–	–	–	–	–
Trinity	–	–	–	–	–	–	–	–	–	–	–	–	–
Tufts	–	–	–	–	–	–	–	5	1	4	0	–	–
Union	–	–	–	–	–	–	–	3	1	2	0	–	–
Williams	3	3	0	0	1.000	32	6	4	4	0	0	48	6
Yale	5	5	0	0	1.000	35	11	9	5	4	0	41	34

1907–08 Intercollegiate Hockey Association standings
	Conference							Overall					
	GP	W	L	T	PTS	GF	GA	GP	W	L	T	GF	GA
Yale *	4	4	0	0	8	28	10	9	5	4	0	41	34
Harvard	4	3	1	0	6	32	9	9	7	2	0	55	17
Princeton	4	1	3	0	2	9	15	15	8	7	0	54	44
Dartmouth	4	1	3	0	2	11	25	7	1	5	1	15	37
Columbia	4	1	3	0	2	6	27	5	1	4	0	6	30
* indicates conference champion

== Schedule and results ==
Date	Opponent	Site	Result	Record
Regular Season
January 8	vs. Princeton	St. Nicholas Rink • New York, New York	W 3–2	1–0–0 (1–0–0)
January 15	vs. Yale	St. Nicholas Rink • New York, New York	L 3–9	1–1–0 (1–1–0)
January 16	at Columbia	St. Nicholas Rink • New York, New York	L 2–4	1–2–0 (1–2–0)
January 17	at Rensselaer*	Empire Rink • Albany, New York	T 4–4 ^{2OT}	1–2–1 (1–2–1)
January 24	Bishop's*	Durham, New Hampshire	L 0–3	1–3–1
February 8	at Harvard	Harvard Stadium Rink • Boston, Massachusetts	L 3–10	1–4–1 (1–3–1)
February 10	vs. MIT*	Brae Burn Rink • Newton, Massachusetts	L 0–5	1–5–1 (1–4–1)
*Non-conference game.
