= 1910–11 Williams Ephs men's ice hockey season =

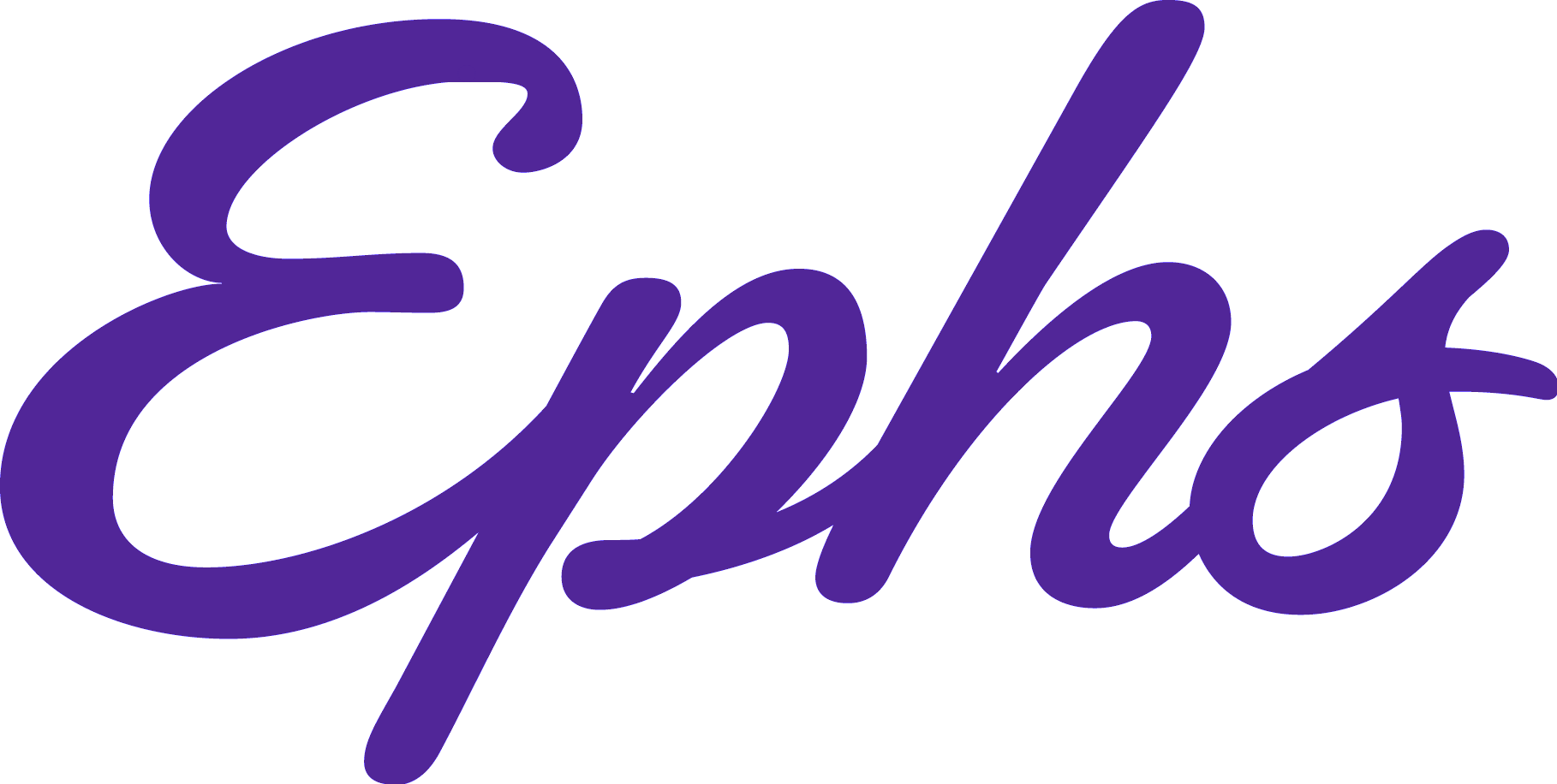
- Home ice: Cole Field House Pond

Record
- Overall: 3–5–1
- Home: 1–2–1
- Road: 2–2–0
- Neutral: 0–1–0

Coaches and captains

The 1910–11 Williams Ephs men's ice hockey season was the 8th season of play for the program.

== Roster ==
No.	Nat.	Player	Class	Pos	Height	Weight	DoB	Hometown	Previous team
		Charles W. Curtis	Junior	G
		George T. Curtis	Freshman	F
		Fields		RW
		John W. Gillett	Freshman	R
	(United States)	Sidney M. Michael	Sophomore	D			1891-12-23	Buffalo, New York
	(United States)	J. Dudley Peterson	Senior	D			1887-10-30	Lockport, New York
		George W. VanGorder	Senior	C
		Winter		LW

== Standings ==
1910–11 Collegiate ice hockey standings
	Intercollegiate							Overall					
	GP	W	L	T	PCT.	GF	GA	GP	W	L	T	GF	GA
Amherst	–	–	–	–	–	–	–	7	3	3	1	–	–
Army	4	1	3	0	.250	6	7	4	1	3	0	6	7
Case	–	–	–	–	–	–	–	–	–	–	–	–	–
Columbia	7	4	3	0	.571	22	19	7	4	3	0	22	19
Cornell	10	10	0	0	1.000	49	13	10	10	0	0	49	13
Dartmouth	7	2	5	0	.286	17	33	10	4	6	0	28	43
Harvard	8	7	1	0	.875	53	10	10	8	2	0	63	17
Massachusetts Agricultural	8	6	2	0	.750	39	17	9	7	2	0	44	21
MIT	4	3	1	0	.750	22	11	10	5	5	0	45	49
Pennsylvania	1	0	1	0	.000	0	7	1	0	1	0	0	7
Princeton	10	5	5	0	.500	31	31	10	5	5	0	31	31
Rensselaer	4	0	4	0	.000	5	35	4	0	4	0	5	35
Springfield Training	–	–	–	–	–	–	–	–	–	–	–	–	–
Stevens Tech	–	–	–	–	–	–	–	–	–	–	–	–	–
Trinity	–	–	–	–	–	–	–	–	–	–	–	–	–
Union	–	–	–	–	–	–	–	1	1	0	0	–	–
Western Reserve	–	–	–	–	–	–	–	–	–	–	–	–	–
Williams	7	2	4	1	.357	23	26	9	2	6	1	30	42
Yale	13	4	9	0	.308	43	49	16	6	10	0	59	62

== Schedule and results ==
Date	Opponent	Site	Result	Record
Regular Season
December 10	Massachusetts Agricultural*	Weston Field Rink • Williamstown, Massachusetts	L 3–6	0–1–0
December 17	vs. Rensselaer*	Weston Field Rink • Williamstown, Massachusetts	W 11–0	1–1–0
December 22	Princeton*	St. Nicholas Rink • New York, New York	L 2–3	1–2–0
January 21	Amherst*	Weston Field Rink • Williamstown, Massachusetts	L 0–2	1–3–0
January 28	at Louden Field Club*	Empire Rink • Albany, New York	L 5–6	1–4–0
February 11	Louden Field Club*	Weston Field Rink • Williamstown, Massachusetts	L 2–10	1–5–0
February 16	at MIT*	Boston Arena • Boston, Massachusetts	L 3–12	1–6–0
February 20	at Amherst*	Pratt Field Rink • Amherst, Massachusetts	T 1–1 ^{4OT}	1–6–1
February 22	at Army*	Lusk Reservoir • West Point, New York	W 3–2	2–6–1
*Non-conference game.
