= 1910–11 RPI men's ice hockey season =

- Conference: Independent

Record
- Overall: 0–4–0
- Home: 0–3–0
- Road: 0–1–0

Coaches and captains
- Captain: John Stevens

The 1910–11 RPI men's ice hockey season was the 8th season of play for the program.

== Season ==
The team had a dreadful season, losing all their games and being soundly beaten in most.

Note: Rensselaer's athletic teams were unofficially known as 'Cherry and White' until 1921 when the Engineers moniker debuted for the men's basketball team.

== Roster ==
No.	Nat.	Player	Class	Pos	Height	Weight	DoB	Hometown	Previous team
		John Stevens (C)

== Standings ==
1910–11 Collegiate ice hockey standings
	Intercollegiate							Overall					
	GP	W	L	T	PCT.	GF	GA	GP	W	L	T	GF	GA
Amherst	–	–	–	–	–	–	–	7	3	3	1	–	–
Army	4	1	3	0	.250	6	7	4	1	3	0	6	7
Case	–	–	–	–	–	–	–	–	–	–	–	–	–
Columbia	7	4	3	0	.571	22	19	7	4	3	0	22	19
Cornell	10	10	0	0	1.000	49	13	10	10	0	0	49	13
Dartmouth	7	2	5	0	.286	17	33	10	4	6	0	28	43
Harvard	8	7	1	0	.875	53	10	10	8	2	0	63	17
Massachusetts Agricultural	8	6	2	0	.750	39	17	9	7	2	0	44	21
MIT	4	3	1	0	.750	22	11	10	5	5	0	45	49
Pennsylvania	1	0	1	0	.000	0	7	1	0	1	0	0	7
Princeton	10	5	5	0	.500	31	31	10	5	5	0	31	31
Rensselaer	4	0	4	0	.000	5	35	4	0	4	0	5	35
Springfield Training	–	–	–	–	–	–	–	–	–	–	–	–	–
Stevens Tech	–	–	–	–	–	–	–	–	–	–	–	–	–
Trinity	–	–	–	–	–	–	–	–	–	–	–	–	–
Union	–	–	–	–	–	–	–	1	1	0	0	–	–
Western Reserve	–	–	–	–	–	–	–	–	–	–	–	–	–
Williams	7	2	4	1	.357	23	26	9	2	6	1	30	42
Yale	13	4	9	0	.308	43	49	16	6	10	0	59	62

== Schedule and results ==
Date	Opponent	Site	Result	Record
Regular Season
December 17	at Williams*	Weston Field Rink • Williamstown, Massachusetts	L 0–11	0–1–0
January 20	Massachusetts Agricultural College*	Empire Rink • Albany, New York	L 1–12	0–2–0
February 10	Springfield Training*	Empire Rink • Albany, New York	L 2–9	0–3–0
February 17	Trinity*	Empire Rink • Albany, New York	L 2–3	0–4–0
*Non-conference game.
