= Jefferson Vincent =

American ice hockey player

- Born: May 3, 1888 Allegheny, Pennsylvania, U.S.
- Died: May 14, 1918 (aged 30) Saint-Mihiel, France
- Position: Forward
- Played for: Cornell
- Playing career: 1906–1911

Jefferson Vincent
- Burial place: St. Mihiel American Cemetery and Memorial
- Military career
- Allegiance: United States
- Branch: Division of Military Aeronautics
- Service years: 1917–1918
- Rank: First Lieutenant

Jefferson Davis Vincent (May 3, 1888 – May 14, 1918) was an American ice hockey player who starred for Cornell when the program won its first championship in 1911. After graduating he served in the United States Department of State as a diplomat and helped keep Spain out of World War I. Once the US entered the war he enlisted and joined the 24th Aero Squadron as a first lieutenant. He died during a training mission for what would later be the St. Mihiel Offensive and is buried at the St. Mihiel American Cemetery and Memorial.

== College career ==
After graduating from Mercersburg Academy in 1906, Vincent began attending Cornell University in the College of Engineering. With a keen interest for ice hockey, Vincent was a member of the freshman squad and served as manager for the Varsity team in its first year back. He joined the Big Red fully in his sophomore season, serving as an alternate much of the time. Cornell was invited to join the Intercollegiate Hockey Association for the 1909 season but with much of the team graduating in 1908 the Big Red declined during Vincent's junior year. Despite this hopes were high for the program in what would have been Vincent's senior year but family issues forced him to leave school for the 1909–10 academic year. After his mother moved to Buffalo Vincent returned to Cornell to complete his degree and lead the ice hockey team to its brightest moment.

With Talbot Hunter now coaching the Big Red, Vincent was initially placed on the second team but during an intra-squad match Vincent's talent became readily apparent and he was the only second-team player to be retained as a varsity member. Vincent responded by becoming Cornell's top goal scorer and often opened the scoring for his team. Vincent scored two hat-tricks in his first 5 games and Cornell would need those heroics with the IHA season starting on January 14. Vincent scored at least one goal in each of Cornell's five conference games but it was the overtime goal against the vaunted Harvard Crimson that cemented his legacy in Ithaca. Cornell would finish the season with a perfect 10–0 record and win their first IHA championship (the de facto National Championship) while Vincent ended with an average of 2.11 goals per game in his career, a perfect sendoff for one of the game's star players.

== Diplomatic career ==
Despite his degree in Engineering it was Vincent's fluency in Spanish that helped propel him into his professional career. He joined the diplomatic corps and was first posted to Chile before transferring to Spain just prior to the first World War. After the outbreak of hostilities in September 1914, Vincent was one of the diplomats who job it was to convince Italy that it did not have to honor its defensive pact with Germany. While they were successful in breaking Italy off from the Central Powers (a move that was largely predicted prior to the war) they could not prevent Italy from joining the war in 1915. Vincent found greater success on his return to Spain where he helped encouraged the government to remain neutral for the duration of the conflict.

== Military career ==
Despite his role as a proponent of peace, once the United States entered the war on April 6, 1917, Vincent enlisted. During his time at Cornell Vincent had served in the signal reserve corps and was already a trained officer. As a college graduate with a history of service to his country, Vincent became one of just 2% of servicemen who were commissioned as officers and he was placed in the 24th Aero Squadron. After training at Kelly Field his squad was transferred to Long Island where they waited for several months before being deployed to France. Vincent's squadron was placed in the 1st Army Observation Group and based at the Gondreville-sur-Moselle Aerodrome. Shortly after his 30th birthday Vincent went on a training mission to practice for the upcoming battles but he disappeared during the exercise and was killed. He is buried at the St. Mihiel American Cemetery and Memorial as one of 4,153 servicemen who died during the war.
