= 1910–11 United States collegiate men's ice hockey season =

- Duration: December 1910– March 1911
- Collegiate champion: Cornell

The 1910–11 United States collegiate men's ice hockey season was the 17th season of collegiate ice hockey.

== Regular season ==
=== Standings ===
1910–11 Collegiate ice hockey standings
| | Intercollegiate | | | | | | | Overall | | | | | |
| | GP | W | L | T | PCT. | GF | GA | GP | W | L | T | GF | GA |
|---|---|---|---|---|---|---|---|---|---|---|---|---|---|
| Amherst | – | – | – | – | – | – | – | 7 | 3 | 3 | 1 | – | – |
| Army | 4 | 1 | 3 | 0 | .250 | 6 | 7 | 4 | 1 | 3 | 0 | 6 | 7 |
| Case | – | – | – | – | – | – | – | – | – | – | – | – | – |
| Columbia | 7 | 4 | 3 | 0 | .571 | 22 | 19 | 7 | 4 | 3 | 0 | 22 | 19 |
| Cornell | 10 | 10 | 0 | 0 | 1.000 | 49 | 13 | 10 | 10 | 0 | 0 | 49 | 13 |
| Dartmouth | 7 | 2 | 5 | 0 | .286 | 17 | 33 | 10 | 4 | 6 | 0 | 28 | 43 |
| Harvard | 8 | 7 | 1 | 0 | .875 | 53 | 10 | 10 | 8 | 2 | 0 | 63 | 17 |
| Massachusetts Agricultural | 8 | 6 | 2 | 0 | .750 | 39 | 17 | 9 | 7 | 2 | 0 | 44 | 21 |
| MIT | 4 | 3 | 1 | 0 | .750 | 22 | 11 | 10 | 5 | 5 | 0 | 45 | 49 |
| Pennsylvania | 1 | 0 | 1 | 0 | .000 | 0 | 7 | 1 | 0 | 1 | 0 | 0 | 7 |
| Princeton | 10 | 5 | 5 | 0 | .500 | 31 | 31 | 10 | 5 | 5 | 0 | 31 | 31 |
| Rensselaer | 4 | 0 | 4 | 0 | .000 | 5 | 35 | 4 | 0 | 4 | 0 | 5 | 35 |
| Springfield Training | – | – | – | – | – | – | – | – | – | – | – | – | – |
| Stevens Tech | – | – | – | – | – | – | – | – | – | – | – | – | – |
| Trinity | – | – | – | – | – | – | – | – | – | – | – | – | – |
| Union | – | – | – | – | – | – | – | 1 | 1 | 0 | 0 | – | – |
| Western Reserve | – | – | – | – | – | – | – | – | – | – | – | – | – |
| Williams | 7 | 2 | 4 | 1 | .357 | 23 | 26 | 9 | 2 | 6 | 1 | 30 | 42 |
| Yale | 13 | 4 | 9 | 0 | .308 | 43 | 49 | 16 | 6 | 10 | 0 | 59 | 62 |

1910–11 Intercollegiate Hockey Association standings
| | Conference | | | | | | | Overall | | | | | |
| | GP | W | L | T | PTS | GF | GA | GP | W | L | T | GF | GA |
|---|---|---|---|---|---|---|---|---|---|---|---|---|---|
| Cornell * | 5 | 5 | 0 | 0 | 10 | 20 | 6 | 10 | 10 | 0 | 0 | 49 | 13 |
| Harvard | 5 | 4 | 1 | 0 | 8 | 27 | 7 | 10 | 8 | 2 | 0 | 63 | 17 |
| Columbia | 5 | 2 | 3 | 0 | 4 | 9 | 17 | 7 | 4 | 3 | 0 | 22 | 19 |
| Yale | 5 | 2 | 3 | 0 | 4 | 16 | 15 | 16 | 6 | 10 | 0 | 59 | 62 |
| Dartmouth | 5 | 1 | 4 | 0 | 2 | 12 | 30 | 10 | 4 | 6 | 0 | 28 | 43 |
| Princeton | 5 | 1 | 4 | 0 | 2 | 7 | 16 | 10 | 5 | 5 | 0 | 31 | 31 |
* indicates conference champion
