= Ed Nagle =

Canadian ice hockey player

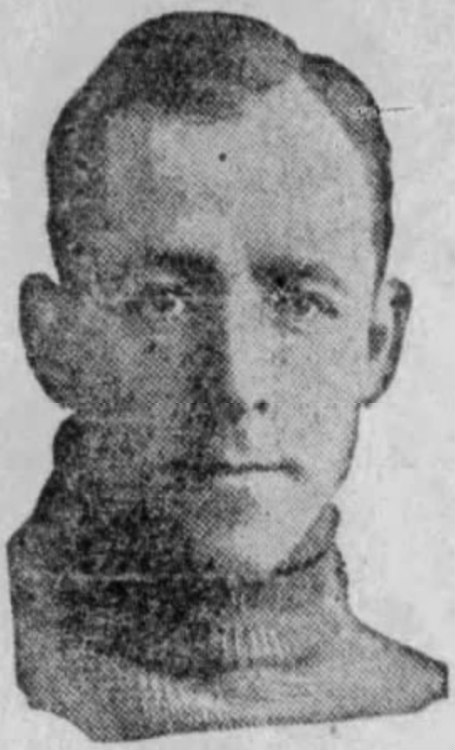
- Nagle c. 1921
- Born: August 10, 1893; Ottawa, Ontario, Canada
- Died: June 24, 1966 (aged 72) near San Francisco, California, U.S.
- Height: 5 ft 8 in (173 cm)
- Weight: 165 lb (75 kg; 11 st 11 lb)
- Position: Right wing
- Played for: Saskatoon Sheiks
- Playing career: 1913–1924

Edmund Burke "Doc" Nagle (August 10, 1893 – June 24, 1966) was a Canadian professional ice hockey player, born in Ottawa. He played for the Saskatoon Sheiks in the Western Canada Hockey League.

== Biography ==
Nagle was a dentist, hence his nickname "Doc".

An all-around athlete, he competed in multiple sports, including football, ice hockey, track and field and baseball, while studying at the University of Ottawa.

He received his dental education at the University of Pittsburgh, where he also played amateur hockey for the Pittsburgh Athletic Association and was elected captain of the team at the beginning of the 1919–20 season. Roy Schooley, who assembled the very first U.S. Olympic ice hockey team in 1920, said he would have included Nagle on the roster if Nagle had been eligible to compete for the U.S.

Nagle coached multiple sports for many years in Saskatoon and Battleford, including football at the University of Saskatchewan.

He died on an ocean cruiser outside of San Francisco in 1966, at the age of 72.
