= Reverend Father Stanton =

Canadian football coach and missionary (1880–1937)

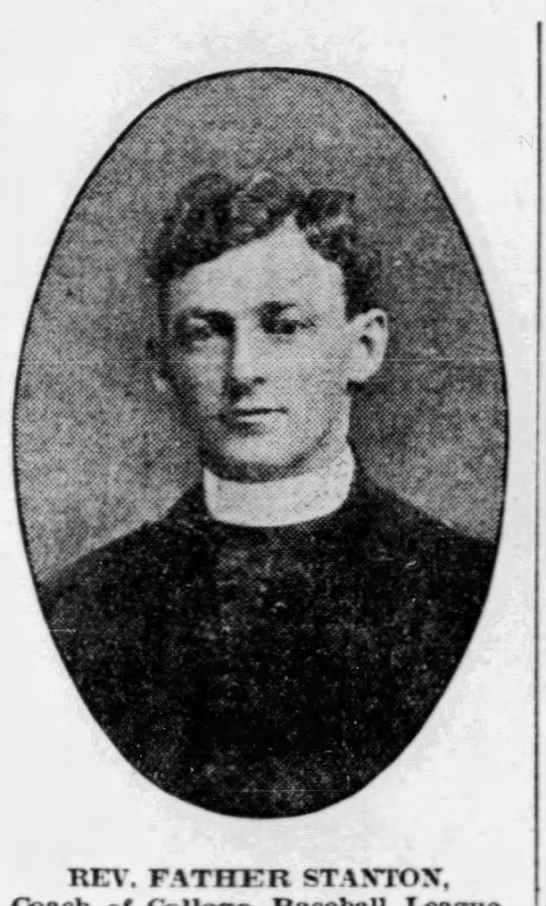

Profile
- Position: Coach

Personal information
- Born: July 1, 1880; Buffalo, New York, U.S.
- Died: January 1, 1937 (aged 56)

Career history
- 1900s–1915: University of Ottawa
- 1913: Ottawa Rough Riders

Reverend Father William J. Stanton (July 1, 1880 – January 1, 1937) was a Canadian football coach and missionary. He was the head coach of multiple of the Ottawa Gee-Gees teams from the 1900s to 1915 and the head coach of the Ottawa Rough Riders in 1913. He was considered to be one of the greatest Canadian rugby coaches. He retired from coaching in 1915 to become a missionary. Canadian Football Hall of Famer Mike Rodden described him as "The Knute Rockne of his time". He died on January 1, 1937, in a car accident. He was inducted into the Ottawa Gee-Gees Hall of Fame in 1973.
