= Elysium Arena =

Former sporting venue in the United States

Coordinates: 41°30′15″N 81°36′46″W

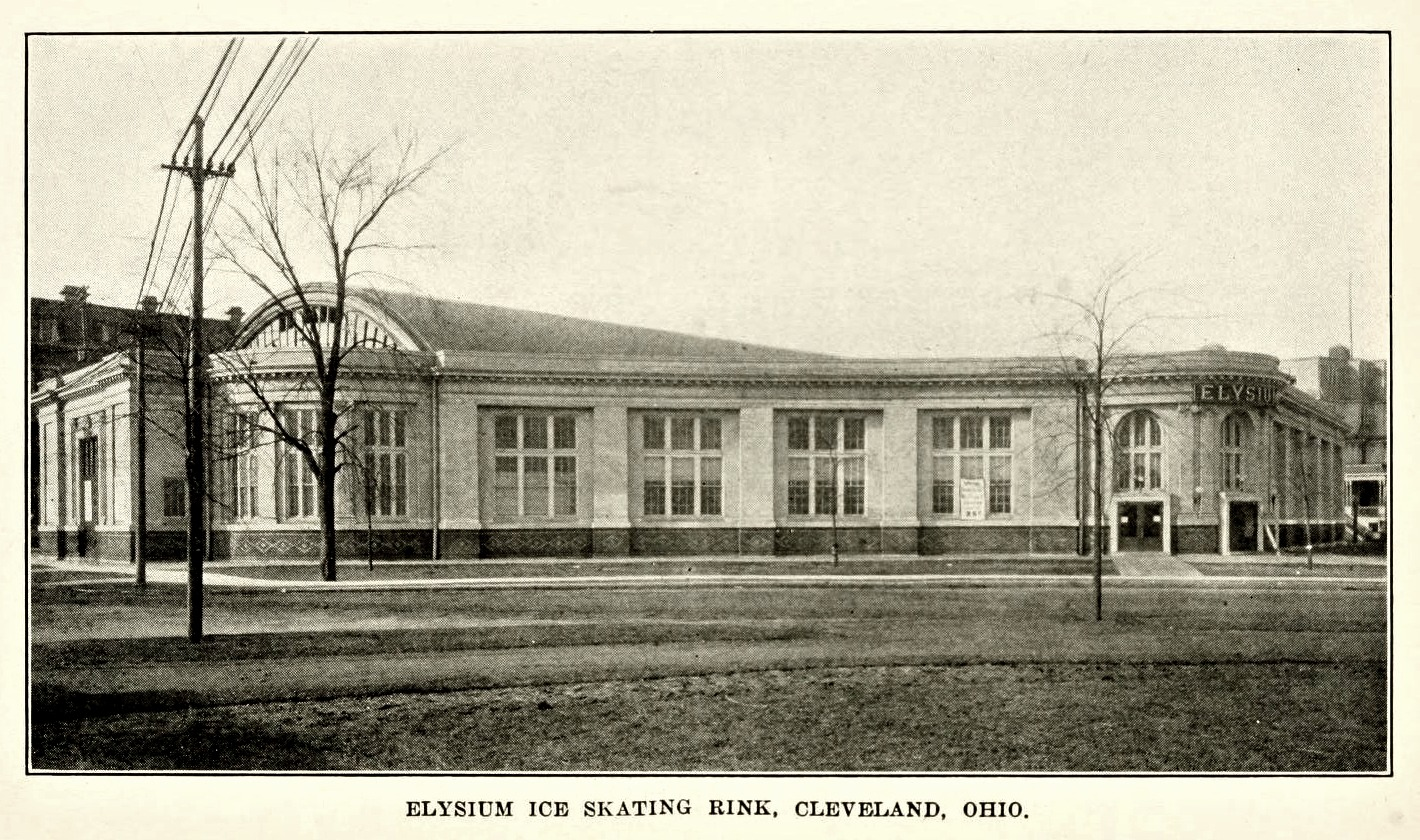
- Exterior of the Elysium Arena
- Interactive map of Elysium Arena
- Location: corner of E. 107th St. and Euclid in Cleveland, Ohio
- Operator: Humphrey Co.
- Capacity: 3,500
- Surface: mechanically frozen ice
- Field size: 86x238

Construction
- Opened: 1907
- Closed: 1938
- Demolished: 1951

Tenants
- Cleveland A.C. (1907–1925); Cleveland Falcons (1936–37)

The Elysium Arena was an indoor arena at the corner of E. 107th St. and Euclid in Cleveland, Ohio. It hosted the American Hockey League's Cleveland Falcons from 1936 to 1937. The arena held 3,500 people and opened in 1907. It was superseded in 1938 by the Cleveland Arena, and in 1951 was demolished by the city of Cleveland.

Cleveland Hockey Club, champions of the 1920–21 United States Amateur Hockey Association, played at the Elysium Arena.

== History ==
The arena was launched and operated by Dudley S. Humphrey III of the Humphrey Co., who also operated the Euclid Beach Park amusement park in Cleveland.

=== 1915 Elysium Arena riot ===
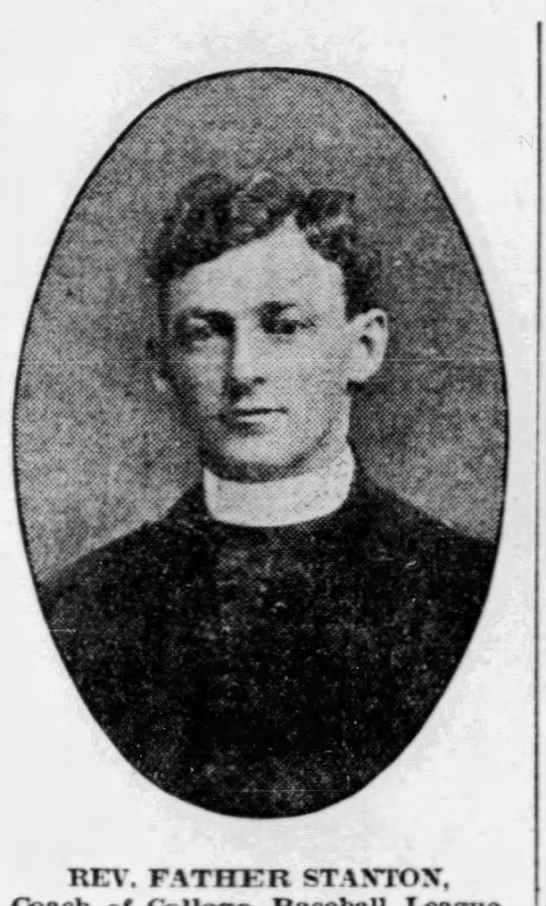
Father William Stanton.

On January 2, 1915 a full-scale riot broke out at the Elysium Arena at the conclusion of an ice hockey game between the Cleveland Athletic Club and the visiting Ottawa College team, where the spectators eventually joined in and the police had to be called upon to quell the disturbance.

According to the Canadians the trouble had started when Cleveland player Frank "Coddy" Winters first threatened to "get" every one of the visiting players, and then also verbally abused their coach Father William Stanton with "the coarsest language", and that it later escalated into a full-scale riot when Cleveland player Elmer Irving threatened both the referee and the Ottawa players after having been penalized.

The Cleveland version on the other hand laid the blame on Ottawa player Jim Burnett, claiming the riot had started when Burnett slashed Coddy Winters across the nose with his stick. In the following melee Ottawa's goaltender Vincent Doran hit Elmer Irving over the head with his stick, after Irving had held down Ed Nagle, which left Irving with a fractured skull. Cleveland's trainer then took part in the melee and hit Ottawa player Redmond Quain over the head with a bottle. The spectators (a 2,000 crowd) then jumped onto the ice to join in, and the police had to be called upon to quell the disturbance, with a number of people getting hurt in the ensuing panic. Vincent Doran was arrested on a charge of assault to kill, for his attack on Irving, and his teammate Redmond Quain also appeared in a Cleveland police court as a witness against the Cleveland team's trainer. Doran was later dismissed by the police court when Irving refused to prosecute him.

"Ottawa College will not play again in Cleveland. The trouble is that Cleveland wants to win by any means. We had to put up with incompetent officials besides being victims of brutal attacks of the opposing team, which culminated during the final match in the disgraceful scene I have described."

— Father William Stanton on the Elysium Arena riot
