= Salvini (surname) =

Salvini is an Italian surname. Notable people with the surname include:

- Anton Maria Salvini (1653–1729), Italian naturalist and classicist
- Emil Salvini, American historian/author/host of "Tales of the Jersey Shore" on NJ-TV
- Emily Salvini, victim of an arson attack
- Fanny Salvini-Donatelli (c.1815–1891), Italian operatic soprano
- Giorgio Salvini (1920–2015), Italian physicist
- Guido Salvini (disambiguation), several people
- Mario Salvini (1863–1940), Italian ceramist and sculptor
- Matteo Salvini (born 1973), Italian politician and Senator of the Republic
- Maud Dixon Salvini (1866–1944), British American actress and playwright
- Milena Salvini (1933–2022)
- Sandro Salvini (1890–1955), Italian actor
- Salvino Salvini (1824–1899), Italian sculptor
- Tommaso Salvini (1829–1915), Italian actor
- Vittoria Salvini (born 1965), Italian female mountain runner
