= 1911–12 Princeton Tigers men's ice hockey season =

College ice hockey season

Intercollegiate Champion Intercollegiate Hockey Association, Champion
- Conference: 1st IHA
- Home ice: St. Nicholas Rink, New York City

Record
- Overall: 8–2–0
- Conference: 4–0–0
- Road: 2–0–0
- Neutral: 6–2–0

Coaches and captains
- Head coach: Gus Hornfeck
- Captain: Alfred Kay

The 1911–12 Princeton Tigers men's ice hockey season was the 13th season of play for the program.

== Season ==
After a disappointing end to their previous season, second-year captain Alfred Kay looked to lead the team back to the top of the Intercollegiate Hockey Association. That job was made slightly easier due to Harvard removing itself from the conference due to a new policy by the operators at the St. Nicholas Rink. The Tigers began their season just after the start of the winter break with a game against Williams. Princeton won the extraordinarily lopsided game 14–0 and the headed to Cleveland for a three-game series with Yale. As they had the year before, Princeton won two of the three games but through their first four games it was apparent that the Tigers had a budding star on their hands.

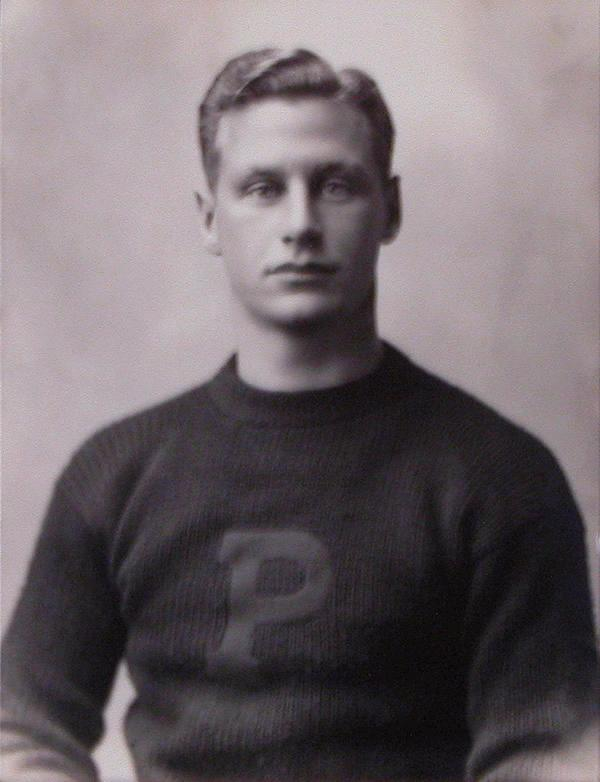
Hobey Baker

Sophomore Hobey Baker distinguished himself from the first game against Williams, scoring 6 goals and immediately becoming the focal point of the Princeton offense. Baker's first real test with the team came in early January against Dartmouth. In their first conference game of the year Princeton utterly dominated the greens, posting the largest victory in the history of IHA play, 14–0. Throughout the game Baker was obvious as the best player on the ice and, while he scored four goals himself, he was responsible for a dozen of Princeton's scores, assisting directly on five of Kuhn's six tallies.

The next game came against Harvard who, despite having left the IHA, had agreed to play two games against Princeton that year. Despite their impressive wins to that point the Tigers had yet to face a team as talented as the Crimson and that was proven when Harvard skated away with a 3–2 win. Even in defeat Baker starred, scoring a goal and assisting on the other while simultaneously trying to hold back the vaunted Harvard attack. Still stinging after the defeat, Princeton laid into defending champion Cornell in their next game with Baker again the center of attention. The rover scored his second hat-trick of league play and assisted on at least two other goals in the Tigers' 6–1 win. A week later the Tigers played their second game against Harvard, this time at the Crimson's home venue. Princeton repaid Harvard for the earlier loss with their own 3–2 victory with Baker's second goal of the game serving as the eventual game-winner.

Princeton returned to its conference schedule just two days later against an improving Columbia team. The Lions kept the game close until midway through the second half when Baker scored a natural hat-trick to give the Tigers a commanding lead that they would ride to a 6–2 victory. In Princeton's final game of the season they took on Yale, the only team that could stop them from claiming the IHA championship. The two teams battled to a 0–0 draw after the first half but in the second half, as he had done all season, Hobey Baker came alive for the Tigers. He recorded yet another hat-trick and added an assist on Alfred Kay's goal to give the Tigers a 4–1 victory and their second championship in three years.

Despite being a sophomore, Hobey Baker was the best player on his team and likely the best in college hockey, if not the entire country. He scored a hat-trick in each of the four IHA games, notching 26 goals and at least 15 assists in just 10 games. The team, recognizing his talent and leadership, elected him captain for the following season.

== Roster ==
| No. | Nat. | Player | Class | Pos | Height | Weight | DoB | Hometown | Previous team |
|---|---|---|---|---|---|---|---|---|---|
| | (United States) | Hobey Baker | Sophomore | R | 5' 9" (1.75 m) | 161 lb (73 kg) | 1892-01-15 | Bala Cynwyd, Pennsylvania | St. Paul's School |
| | | Lawrence Blair | Senior | D |
| | | Thornton Emmons | Sophomore | D |
| | | Dean Kalbfleisch | Senior | G |
| | (United States) | Alfred Kay | Senior | RW | | | | Pittsburgh, Pennsylvania |
| | | Wendel Kuhn | Sophomore | C |
| | | Robert C. Lee | Junior | D |
| | | James McKinney | Senior | LW |

== Standings ==
1911–12 Collegiate ice hockey standings
| | Intercollegiate | | | | | | | Overall | | | | | |
| | GP | W | L | T | PCT. | GF | GA | GP | W | L | T | GF | GA |
|---|---|---|---|---|---|---|---|---|---|---|---|---|---|
| Amherst | – | – | – | – | – | – | – | 7 | 2 | 4 | 1 | – | – |
| Army | 5 | 2 | 2 | 1 | .500 | 9 | 19 | 5 | 2 | 2 | 1 | 9 | 19 |
| Columbia | 4 | 3 | 1 | 0 | .750 | 20 | 16 | 4 | 3 | 1 | 0 | 20 | 16 |
| Connecticut Agricultural | 1 | 0 | 1 | 0 | .000 | 0 | 10 | 2 | 1 | 1 | 0 | 2 | 10 |
| Cornell | 9 | 3 | 6 | 0 | .333 | 24 | 27 | 12 | 5 | 7 | 0 | 40 | 37 |
| Dartmouth | 5 | 0 | 5 | 0 | .000 | 12 | 35 | 5 | 0 | 5 | 0 | 12 | 35 |
| Harvard | 8 | 5 | 3 | 0 | .625 | 26 | 19 | 10 | 7 | 3 | 0 | 36 | 21 |
| Massachusetts Agricultural | 7 | 5 | 1 | 1 | .786 | 33 | 9 | 7 | 5 | 1 | 1 | 33 | 9 |
| MIT | 6 | 5 | 1 | 0 | .833 | 32 | 7 | 10 | 6 | 4 | 0 | 43 | 24 |
| Norwich | – | – | – | – | – | – | – | – | – | – | – | – | – |
| Notre Dame | 0 | 0 | 0 | 0 | – | 0 | 0 | 1 | 1 | 0 | 0 | 7 | 1 |
| Princeton | 10 | 8 | 2 | 0 | .800 | 63 | 16 | 10 | 8 | 2 | 0 | 63 | 16 |
| Rensselaer | 5 | 1 | 3 | 1 | .300 | 5 | 14 | 6 | 2 | 3 | 1 | 10 | 15 |
| Rochester | – | – | – | – | – | – | – | – | – | – | – | – | – |
| Springfield Training | – | – | – | – | – | – | – | – | – | – | – | – | – |
| Stevens Tech | – | – | – | – | – | – | – | – | – | – | – | – | – |
| Syracuse | – | – | – | – | – | – | – | – | – | – | – | – | – |
| Trinity | – | – | – | – | – | – | – | – | – | – | – | – | – |
| Williams | 6 | 1 | 4 | 1 | .250 | 10 | 29 | 7 | 2 | 4 | 1 | 11 | 29 |
| Yale | 16 | 9 | 7 | 0 | .563 | 41 | 46 | 18 | 11 | 7 | 0 | 46 | 49 |

1911–12 Intercollegiate Hockey Association standings
| | Conference | | | | | | | Overall | | | | | |
| | GP | W | L | T | PTS | GF | GA | GP | W | L | T | GF | GA |
|---|---|---|---|---|---|---|---|---|---|---|---|---|---|
| Princeton * | 4 | 4 | 0 | 0 | 8 | 30 | 4 | 10 | 8 | 2 | 0 | 63 | 16 |
| Columbia | 4 | 3 | 1 | 0 | 6 | 20 | 16 | 4 | 3 | 1 | 0 | 20 | 16 |
| Yale | 4 | 2 | 2 | 0 | 4 | 11 | 15 | 18 | 11 | 7 | 0 | 46 | 49 |
| Cornell | 4 | 1 | 3 | 0 | 2 | 8 | 16 | 12 | 5 | 7 | 0 | 40 | 37 |
| Dartmouth | 4 | 0 | 4 | 0 | 0 | 9 | 28 | 5 | 0 | 5 | 0 | 12 | 35 |
* indicates conference champion

== Schedule and results ==
| Date | Opponent | Site | Result | Record |
Regular Season
| December 21 | vs. Williams* | St. Nicholas Rink • New York, New York | W 14–0 | 1–0–0 |
| December 28 | vs. Yale* | Elysium Arena • Cleveland, Ohio | W 4–1 | 2–0–0 |
| December 29 | vs. Yale* | Elysium Arena • Cleveland, Ohio | W 7–2 | 3–0–0 |
| December 30 | vs. Yale* | Elysium Arena • Cleveland, Ohio | L 3–4 ^{OT} | 3–1–0 |
| January 6 | vs. Dartmouth | Boston Arena • Boston, Massachusetts | W 14–0 | 4–1–0 (1–0–0) |
| January 10 | vs. Harvard* | St. Nicholas Rink • New York, New York | L 2–3 | 4–2–0 |
| January 13 | vs. Cornell | St. Nicholas Rink • New York, New York | W 6–1 | 5–2–0 (2–0–0) |
| January 20 | at Harvard* | Boston Arena • Boston, Massachusetts | W 3–2 | 6–2–0 |
| January 22 | at Columbia | St. Nicholas Rink • New York, New York | W 6–2 | 7–2–0 (3–0–0) |
| January 27 | vs. Yale | St. Nicholas Rink • New York, New York | W 4–1 | 8–2–0 (4–0–0) |
*Non-conference game.
