= 1911–12 Harvard Crimson men's ice hockey season =

College ice hockey season

- Conference: Independent
- Home ice: Boston Arena

Record
- Overall: 7–3–0
- Home: 7–0–0
- Road: 0–1–0
- Neutral: 0–2–0

Coaches and captains
- Head coach: Alfred Winsor
- Captain: Frederic Huntington

The 1911–12 Harvard Crimson men's ice hockey season was the 15th season of play for the program.

== Season ==
During the offseason, Harvard had withdrawn from the Intercollegiate Hockey Association. The team had reservations about the policies enacted by the operators of the St. Nicholas Rink, which delayed Harvard's entry into the conference for several years, but new policies forced the program to cease dealing with the rink, Because the IHA schedule was conducted almost entirely at the St. Nicholas Rink, Harvard had to withdraw from the league.

Despite leaving, Harvard scheduled many of their former conference opponents for the 1911–12 season and were able to use their home rink, the Boston Arena, as the venue for most games. The Crimson had narrowly missed out on championships in the previous two seasons and were eager to prove that they were the cream of the college hockey crop. There was also a moment to promote ice hockey from a minor to a major sport for the university. The team's play over the course of the season would go a long way to furthering those efforts, but the Crimson couldn't have started much worse when they lost 1–4 to MIT, though they were missing many of their regular players.

Due to the winter break, the Crimson had almost three weeks before their next game. When they hit the ice they did so against Princeton who now possessed one of, if not the best, player in college hockey, Hobey Baker. Harvard was not daunted, however, and the Crimson defense produced a stalwart effort. With Gardner between the pipes, Harvard was able to hold back the potent Tiger attack and keep the game knotted at the end of the first half. The defense fought off Princeton in the second half and allowed team captain Huntington to score what proved to be the game-winner. Ten days later the two teams met in a rematch at the Boston Arena. The building was packed to the gills with spectators wanting to see the two best teams in the nation and they were not disappointed. The game progressed as expected with Princeton's mighty offense assailing the stout Crimson defenders, and this time it was the Tigers who ended up as victors with Baker netting the deciding score.

A week later the team played defending champion Cornell in one of the most disorganized performance of the year. The two teams skated to an unsatisfying draw after regulation and when neither could score in the 10-minute overtime, a second sudden-death session was played with Harvard finishing on top from a Duncan shot. This may be the first use of sudden death overtime in an intercollegiate game. Teamwork continued to elude the Crimson in their next contest but their talent allowed them to defeat St. Francis Xavier. When undefeated McGill came to town the Crimson played one of their best games all year and shut out the Reds 3–0.

In their game against Dartmouth the Crimson again played down to their opposition, winning 7–3 despite sloppy play. The team knew they couldn't play that way in the series against Yale to end their season, not if they wanted to win. Once more Harvard's defense was outstanding allowing Gardner and Smart to share the shutout while Sortwell netted his second hat-trick. The second game four days later was played in New Haven under less than ideal circumstances. Sticky ice caused the game to devolve into a disorganized mess and the lack of cohesion allowed Yale to carry the day, winning 3–2 to force a decisive rubber match with Harvard. In their final game the Crimson proved the victors with a 4–2 win. The triumph capped a mostly successful season in which Harvard defeated both the American and Canadian collegiate champions but had no title to call their own.

== Roster ==
No.	Nat.	Player	Class	Pos	Height	Weight	DoB	Hometown	Previous team
	(United States)	Schuyler Adams	Sophomore	C	5' 6" (1.68 m)	131 lb (59 kg)		West Newton, Massachusetts	Newton High School
	(United States)	Herbert Baldwin	Junior	LW	5' 9" (1.75 m)	146 lb (66 kg)	1891-08-11	Wellesley Hills, Massachusetts	Volkmann School
	(United States)	Robert Blackall	Senior	D	5' 9" (1.75 m)	168 lb (76 kg)	1889-04-26	Cambridge, Massachusetts	Cambridge Rindge and Latin
	(United States)	Gouverneur Carnochan	Sophomore	G		142 lb (64 kg)	1892-06-28	Manhattan, New York	St. Paul's School
		Robert Duncan	Senior	C	5' 6" (1.68 m)	132 lb (60 kg)
		Henry Gardner	Junior	G	5' 9" (1.75 m)	152 lb (69 kg)
		Donald Hanson	Sophomore	C/LW	5' 11" (1.8 m)	161 lb (73 kg)			Melrose High
		Philip Houston	Senior	D	5' 11" (1.8 m)	161 lb (73 kg)			Milton Academy
	(United States)	Frederic Huntington (C)	Senior	C	5' 8" (1.73 m)	165 lb (75 kg)	1889-12-05	Ashfield, Massachusetts	St. Paul's School
		Henry Morgan	Sophomore	RW	5' 9" (1.75 m)	167 lb (76 kg)			St. Mark's School
	(United States)	Franklin Palmer	Junior	C/LW	5' 8" (1.73 m)	141 lb (64 kg)		Plattsburgh, New York
	(United States)	Edward P. Pierce Jr.	Senior	RW	5' 7" (1.7 m)	143 lb (65 kg)	1889-06-17	Fitchburg, Massachusetts	Middlesex Black Bears
		Henry Reeves	Senior	RW	5' 10" (1.78 m)	159 lb (72 kg)			Cambridge Rindge and Latin
	(Canada)	Paul Smart	Sophomore	D		141 lb (64 kg)		Yarmouth, Nova Scotia	Newton High School
		Stephen Smart	Senior	G	5' 7" (1.7 m)	150 lb (68 kg)
	(United States)	Alvin Sortwell	Sophomore	LW	5' 6" (1.68 m)	146 lb (66 kg)		Wiscasset, Maine	St. Paul's School
	(United States)	William Willetts	Sophomore	D		181 lb (82 kg)	1890-05-13	Skaneateles, New York	St. Paul's School
	(United States)	Dana Wingate	Sophomore	D	5' 9" (1.75 m)	137 lb (62 kg)	1891-06-08	Winchester, Massachusetts	Phillips Exeter Academy

== Standings ==
1911–12 Collegiate ice hockey standings
	Intercollegiate							Overall					
	GP	W	L	T	PCT.	GF	GA	GP	W	L	T	GF	GA
Amherst	–	–	–	–	–	–	–	7	2	4	1	–	–
Army	5	2	2	1	.500	9	19	5	2	2	1	9	19
Columbia	4	3	1	0	.750	20	16	4	3	1	0	20	16
Connecticut Agricultural	1	0	1	0	.000	0	10	2	1	1	0	2	10
Cornell	9	3	6	0	.333	24	27	12	5	7	0	40	37
Dartmouth	5	0	5	0	.000	12	35	5	0	5	0	12	35
Harvard	8	5	3	0	.625	26	19	10	7	3	0	36	21
Massachusetts Agricultural	7	5	1	1	.786	33	9	7	5	1	1	33	9
MIT	6	5	1	0	.833	32	7	10	6	4	0	43	24
Norwich	–	–	–	–	–	–	–	–	–	–	–	–	–
Notre Dame	0	0	0	0	–	0	0	1	1	0	0	7	1
Princeton	10	8	2	0	.800	63	16	10	8	2	0	63	16
Rensselaer	5	1	3	1	.300	5	14	6	2	3	1	10	15
Rochester	–	–	–	–	–	–	–	–	–	–	–	–	–
Springfield Training	–	–	–	–	–	–	–	–	–	–	–	–	–
Stevens Tech	–	–	–	–	–	–	–	–	–	–	–	–	–
Syracuse	–	–	–	–	–	–	–	–	–	–	–	–	–
Trinity	–	–	–	–	–	–	–	–	–	–	–	–	–
Williams	6	1	4	1	.250	10	29	7	2	4	1	11	29
Yale	16	9	7	0	.563	41	46	18	11	7	0	46	49

== Schedule and results ==
Date	Opponent	Site	Result	Record
Regular Season
December 21	vs. MIT*	Boston Arena • Boston, Massachusetts	L 1–4	0–1–0
January 10	vs. Princeton*	St. Nicholas Rink • New York, New York	W 3–2	1–1–0
January 20	Princeton*	Boston Arena • Boston, Massachusetts	L 2–3	1–2–0
January 27	Cornell*	Boston Arena • Boston, Massachusetts	W 3–2 ^{2OT}	2–2–0
January 31	St. Francis Xavier*	Boston Arena • Boston, Massachusetts	W 7–2	3–2–0
February 3	McGill*	Boston Arena • Boston, Massachusetts	W 3–0	4–2–0
February 9	Dartmouth*	Boston Arena • Boston, Massachusetts	W 7–3	5–2–0
February 17	Yale*	Boston Arena • Boston, Massachusetts (Rivalry)	W 4–0	6–2–0
February 21	at Yale*	St. Nicholas Rink • New York, New York (Rivalry)	L 2–3	6–3–0
February 24	Yale*	Boston Arena • Boston, Massachusetts (Rivalry)	W 4–2	7–3–0
*Non-conference game.

== Scoring Statistics ==
Name	Position	Games	Goals
Frederic Huntington	C	9	10
Robert Duncan	C	10	9
Alvin Sortwell	LW	8	8
Robert Blackall	D	9	6
Franklin Palmer	C/LW	5	2
Herbert Baldwin	LW	1	1
Schuyler Adams	C	1	0
Gouverneur Carnochan	G	1	0
Paul Smart	D	1	0
Dana Wingate	D	2	0
Philip Houston	D	3	0
Donald Hanson	C/LW	3	0
Henry Morgan	RW	3	0
Stephen Smart	G	3	0
Henry Reeves	RW	5	0
Henry Gardner	G	9	0
Edward Pierce	RW	9	0
William Willetts	D	9	0
Total			36

Note: Assists were not recorded as a statistic.
