= 1911–12 Yale Bulldogs men's ice hockey season =

College ice hockey season

- Conference: 3rd IHA

Record
- Overall: 11–7–0
- Conference: 2–2–0
- Home: 5–0–0
- Road: 0–3–0
- Neutral: 6–4–0

Coaches and captains
- Captain: Archer Harmon

The 1911–12 Yale Bulldogs men's ice hockey season was the 17th season of play for the program.

== Season ==
Yale began the season looking to recover from a poor showing in 1911. After opening with a win over St. Paul's School, Yale headed into their winter break with two 3-game series on the slate. They met Princeton in Cleveland and got their first look at one of the game's rising stars, Hobey Baker. Yale played admirably, winning the last game in overtime, but it was clear that the Bulldog defense had its hand's full with the Tiger rover. The Elis fared better in the series with Cornell, taking the first two games from the defending champions before the Big Red offense awoke for the third match.

The team returned home and had to wait more than a week for the next game. When it came the Elis welcomed MIT for the first game at their new on-campus rink. The facility was a temporary erection near Yale Field and the Bulldogs christened the venue with a 5–3 victory where they demonstrated a great deal of teamwork.

With Harvard having withdrawn from the IHA, Yale's biggest competition for the crown came from Princeton but they were sure to receive a fight from Cornell as well. In the match against the Big Red the two teams fought to a 1–1 tie after regulation. The team captains agreed to play one overtime sessions which would only end once a goal had been scored. The sudden death session continued unabated for 25 minutes and 8 seconds before Archer Harmon scored to give the Elis the win. The game set a record for the longest overtime period played at the St. Nicholas Rink.

After downing Mass Ag 3–0 the Bulldogs faced Princeton in what was expected to be the game to ultimately decide the IHA champion. Neither team was able to score in the first half, with Yale's defense playing particularly well. The Elis opened the scoring with a goal from Cox but afterwards Hobey Baker took over the game. In the final 17 minutes he scored a hat-trick and assisted on a fourth goal to give Princeton a 4–1 victory and all but seal their league championship. Despite the disappointment Yale's season was far from over and they responded with two wins before their third league game.

Columbia entered the game with neither team having much chance for the title but that didn't stop the two teams from producing a very competitive game. The pair battled to a 3–3 tie at the end of the first half but Columbia took over in the second, scoring four times en route to a 7–4 win. The team avoided disaster in the following game by producing a 4-goal second half to overcome a 2-goal lead to down Dartmouth. The game was notable for most of the regular defensive corps being absent, including Carhart who was replaced in net by Thayer.

Yale ended its season with a best of three series against Harvard. Poor ice hampered both teams in the first game but it was the home Crimson who were able to earn the win with their typical oppressive defense. Line juggling and a change of venue allowed Yale to even the series a few days later despite a furious attack by Harvard at the end of the game. In the final game, however, Harvard opened with the first four goals, all in the first half, and Yale could not come back from such a deficit. The Elis fell to the Crimson 4–2, ending the season with a loss that must have left a sour taste in their mouths despite posting a winning record.

The team did not have a coach, however, Esmond O'Brien served as team manager.

== Roster ==
No.	Nat.	Player	Class	Pos	Height	Weight	DoB	Hometown	Previous team
	(United States)	Robert N. Blakeslee Jr.	Junior	D			1893-03-04	Bridgeport, Connecticut
	(United States)	Harold Carhart	Senior	G			1890-01-28	Brooklyn, New York
	(United States)	Alexander W. Chauncey	Junior	RW			1891-04-06	Brooklyn Heights, New York
		Walton Cox	Junior	C/R			1890-12-20
		George A. Gore	Junior	D
		Archer Harman (C)	Junior	R/C/RW			1889-10-11
		Arthur Howe	Senior	C/D
		Joseph S. Kimball	Senior	D/LW
	(United States)	Harvey C. Knowles	Senior	D/RW			1891-03-11	New York, New York
		Clyde Martin	Junior	D/LW
	(United States)	Andrew H. McCreery	Senior	D/LW			1889-09-24	St. Louis, Missouri
	(United States)	Thornton C. Thayer	Junior	G			1890-06-25
		Stuyvesant Wainwright Jr.	Junior	D			1891-01-30		St. Paul's School

== Standings ==
1911–12 Collegiate ice hockey standings
	Intercollegiate							Overall					
	GP	W	L	T	PCT.	GF	GA	GP	W	L	T	GF	GA
Amherst	–	–	–	–	–	–	–	7	2	4	1	–	–
Army	5	2	2	1	.500	9	19	5	2	2	1	9	19
Columbia	4	3	1	0	.750	20	16	4	3	1	0	20	16
Connecticut Agricultural	1	0	1	0	.000	0	10	2	1	1	0	2	10
Cornell	9	3	6	0	.333	24	27	12	5	7	0	40	37
Dartmouth	5	0	5	0	.000	12	35	5	0	5	0	12	35
Harvard	8	5	3	0	.625	26	19	10	7	3	0	36	21
Massachusetts Agricultural	7	5	1	1	.786	33	9	7	5	1	1	33	9
MIT	6	5	1	0	.833	32	7	10	6	4	0	43	24
Norwich	–	–	–	–	–	–	–	–	–	–	–	–	–
Notre Dame	0	0	0	0	–	0	0	1	1	0	0	7	1
Princeton	10	8	2	0	.800	63	16	10	8	2	0	63	16
Rensselaer	5	1	3	1	.300	5	14	6	2	3	1	10	15
Rochester	–	–	–	–	–	–	–	–	–	–	–	–	–
Springfield Training	–	–	–	–	–	–	–	–	–	–	–	–	–
Stevens Tech	–	–	–	–	–	–	–	–	–	–	–	–	–
Syracuse	–	–	–	–	–	–	–	–	–	–	–	–	–
Trinity	–	–	–	–	–	–	–	–	–	–	–	–	–
Williams	6	1	4	1	.250	10	29	7	2	4	1	11	29
Yale	16	9	7	0	.563	41	46	18	11	7	0	46	49

1911–12 Intercollegiate Hockey Association standings
	Conference							Overall					
	GP	W	L	T	PTS	GF	GA	GP	W	L	T	GF	GA
Princeton *	4	4	0	0	8	30	4	10	8	2	0	63	16
Columbia	4	3	1	0	6	20	16	4	3	1	0	20	16
Yale	4	2	2	0	4	11	15	18	11	7	0	46	49
Cornell	4	1	3	0	2	8	16	12	5	7	0	40	37
Dartmouth	4	0	4	0	0	9	28	5	0	5	0	12	35
* indicates conference champion

== Schedule and results ==
Date	Opponent	Site	Result	Record
Regular season
December 20	vs. St. Paul's School*	St. Nicholas Rink • New York, New York	W 2–1	1–0–0
December 28	vs. Princeton*	Elysium Arena • Cleveland, Ohio	L 1–4	1–1–0
December 29	vs. Princeton*	Elysium Arena • Cleveland, Ohio	L 2–6	1–2–0
December 30	vs. Princeton*	Elysium Arena • Cleveland, Ohio	W 4–3	2–2–0
January 1	vs. Cornell*	Arena Ice Rink • Syracuse, New York	W 5–1	3–2–0
January 2	vs. Cornell*	Arena Ice Rink • Syracuse, New York	W 1–0	4–2–0
January 3	vs. Cornell*	Arena Ice Rink • Syracuse, New York	L 0–3	4–3–0
January 13	MIT	Yale Rink • New Haven, Connecticut	W 5–3	5–3–0
January 20	vs. Cornell	St. Nicholas Rink • New York, New York	W 2–1 ^{OT}	6–3–0 (1–0–0)
January 24	Massachusetts Agricultural College*	Yale Rink • New Haven, Connecticut	W 3–0	7–3–0
January 27	vs. Princeton	St. Nicholas Rink • New York, New York	L 1–4	7–4–0 (1–1–0)
January 31	Springfield Training*	Yale Rink • New Haven, Connecticut	W 4–1	8–4–0
February 3	St. Nicholas Hockey Club*	Yale Rink • New Haven, Connecticut	W 3–2 ^{2OT}	9–4–0
February 10	at Columbia	St. Nicholas Rink • New York, New York	L 4–7	9–5–0 (1–2–0)
February 14	Dartmouth	Yale Rink • New Haven, Connecticut	W 4–3	10–5–0 (2–2–0)
February 17	at Harvard*	Boston Arena • Boston, Massachusetts (Rivalry)	L 0–4	10–6–0
February 21	vs. Harvard*	St. Nicholas Rink • New York, New York (Rivalry)	W 3–2	11–6–0
February 24	at Harvard*	Boston Arena • Boston, Massachusetts (Rivalry)	L 2–4	11–7–0
*Non-conference game.
