= 1911–12 Columbia Lions men's ice hockey season =

- Conference: 2nd IHA
- Home ice: St. Nicholas Rink

Record
- Overall: 3–1–0
- Conference: 3–1–0
- Home: 1–1–0
- Neutral: 2–0–0

Coaches and captains
- Head coach: Tom Howard
- Captain: Rufus Trimble

The 1911–12 Columbia Lions men's ice hockey season was the 16th season of play for the program.

== Season ==
Columbia began their season with a win over defending champion Cornell in convincing fashion, though the Big Red were shadows of their former selves. The Lions followed that up with a miraculous victory over Dartmouth; the greens jumped out to a 3–0 lead after the first half but the offence came alive in the second half. With Bates leading the way, Columbia scored five times and won 5–4, giving the Lions hope that they could finally break through for a championship.

The next game came against Princeton with the championship in the balance. While Yale had yet to play a game, Harvard had left the league, leaving the match between Columbia and Princeton as the deciding contest. Unfortunately the Tigers boasted the best player in college hockey and Hobey Baker led Princeton to a 6–3 victory. Bates was again a force for the Lions, recording a hat-trick, but the Tiger's offense was just too much to overcome. Columbia ensured themselves of a second-place finish when they defeated Yale in February and, despite losing the championship, the Lions were encouraged with the growth of the program over the previous two seasons.

An ill omen came later as despite possessing a good schedule, there was so little interest in the freshman hockey team that it was disbanded in mid-February.

== Roster ==
No.	Nat.	Player	Class	Pos	Height	Weight	DoB	Hometown	Previous team
		Francis N. Bangs	Sophomore	W
		John S. Bates	Junior	R
		Robert W. Harris	Senior	RW
		John Lovejoy	Senior	C
		Robert W. Milbank Jr.	Sophomore	G
		Andrew R. Shiland	Junior	RW
		Rufus Trimble (C)	Senior	D
		William M. Washburn	Junior	D
		Bache M. Whitlock	Junior	LW

== Standings ==
1911–12 Collegiate ice hockey standings
	Intercollegiate							Overall					
	GP	W	L	T	PCT.	GF	GA	GP	W	L	T	GF	GA
Amherst	–	–	–	–	–	–	–	7	2	4	1	–	–
Army	5	2	2	1	.500	9	19	5	2	2	1	9	19
Columbia	4	3	1	0	.750	20	16	4	3	1	0	20	16
Connecticut Agricultural	1	0	1	0	.000	0	10	2	1	1	0	2	10
Cornell	9	3	6	0	.333	24	27	12	5	7	0	40	37
Dartmouth	5	0	5	0	.000	12	35	5	0	5	0	12	35
Harvard	8	5	3	0	.625	26	19	10	7	3	0	36	21
Massachusetts Agricultural	7	5	1	1	.786	33	9	7	5	1	1	33	9
MIT	6	5	1	0	.833	32	7	10	6	4	0	43	24
Norwich	–	–	–	–	–	–	–	–	–	–	–	–	–
Notre Dame	0	0	0	0	–	0	0	1	1	0	0	7	1
Princeton	10	8	2	0	.800	63	16	10	8	2	0	63	16
Rensselaer	5	1	3	1	.300	5	14	6	2	3	1	10	15
Rochester	–	–	–	–	–	–	–	–	–	–	–	–	–
Springfield Training	–	–	–	–	–	–	–	–	–	–	–	–	–
Stevens Tech	–	–	–	–	–	–	–	–	–	–	–	–	–
Syracuse	–	–	–	–	–	–	–	–	–	–	–	–	–
Trinity	–	–	–	–	–	–	–	–	–	–	–	–	–
Williams	6	1	4	1	.250	10	29	7	2	4	1	11	29
Yale	16	9	7	0	.563	41	46	18	11	7	0	46	49

1911–12 Intercollegiate Hockey Association standings
	Conference							Overall					
	GP	W	L	T	PTS	GF	GA	GP	W	L	T	GF	GA
Princeton *	4	4	0	0	8	30	4	10	8	2	0	63	16
Columbia	4	3	1	0	6	20	16	4	3	1	0	20	16
Yale	4	2	2	0	4	11	15	18	11	7	0	46	49
Cornell	4	1	3	0	2	8	16	12	5	7	0	40	37
Dartmouth	4	0	4	0	0	9	28	5	0	5	0	12	35
* indicates conference champion

== Schedule and results ==
Date	Opponent	Site	Result	Record
Regular Season
January 6	vs. Cornell	Arena Ice Rink • Syracuse, New York	W 6–2	1–0–0 (1–0–0)
January 15	vs. Dartmouth	Boston Arena • Boston, Massachusetts	W 5–4	2–0–0 (2–0–0)
January 22	Princeton	St. Nicholas Rink • New York, New York	L 2–6	2–1–0 (2–1–0)
February 10	Yale	St. Nicholas Rink • New York, New York	W 7–4	3–1–0 (3–1–0)
*Non-conference game.
