= 1911–12 Williams Ephs men's ice hockey season =

College ice hockey team season

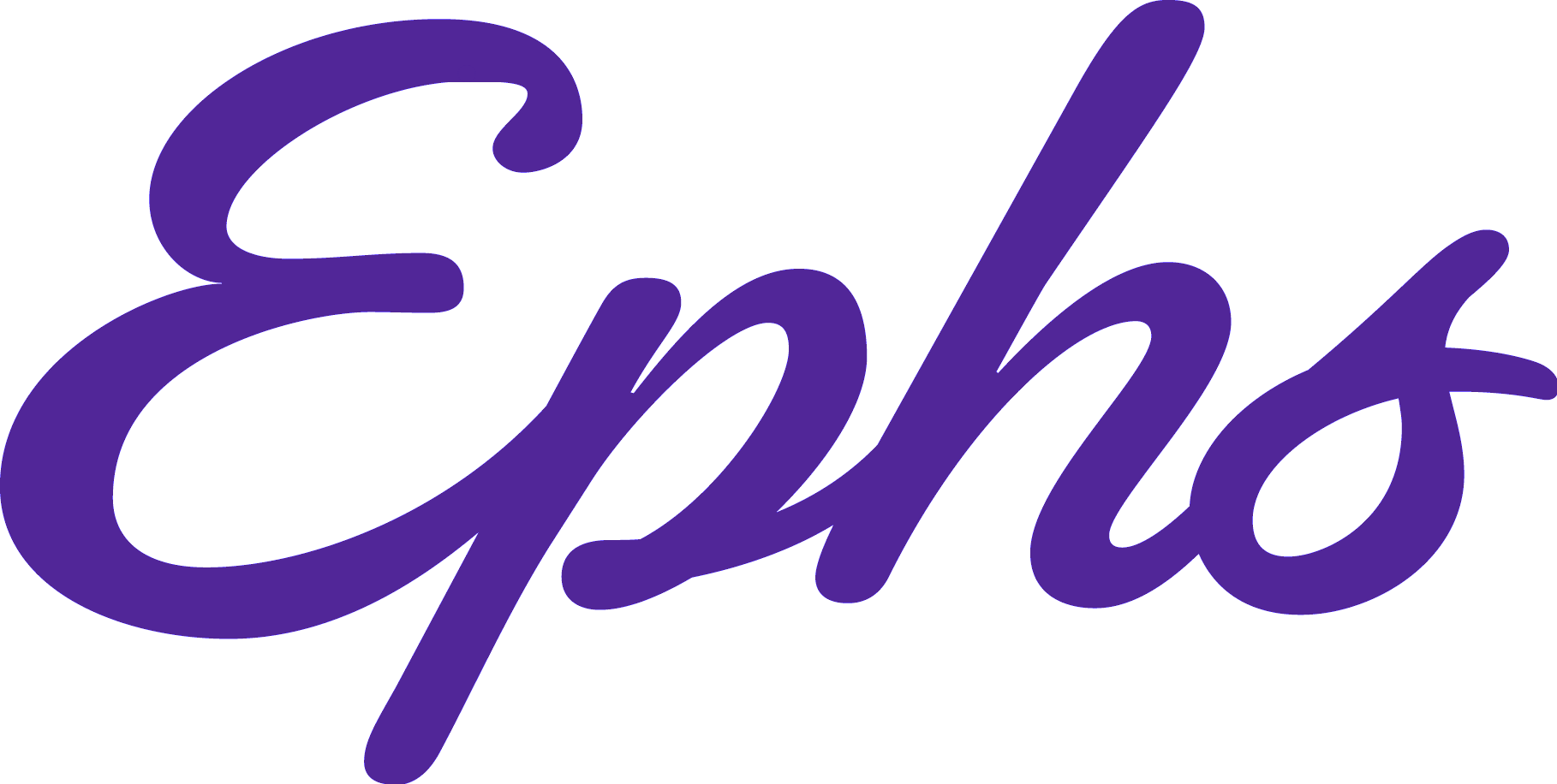
- Home ice: Cole Field House Pond

Record
- Overall: 2–4–1
- Home: 0–2–1
- Road: 1–1–0
- Neutral: 1–1–0

Coaches and captains
- Captain: Sidney Michael

The 1911–12 Williams Ephs men's ice hockey season was the 9th season of play for the program.

== Roster ==
| No. | Nat. | Player | Class | Pos | Height | Weight | DoB | Hometown | Previous team |
|---|---|---|---|---|---|---|---|---|---|
| | | Edward R. Bartlett | Senior | G |
| | | Cole | | G |
| | | George T. Curtis | Sophomore | C/LW |
| | | Conrad F. Cutler | Freshman | RW |
| | (United States) | Eugene H. de Bronkart | Senior | C | | | 1888-12-27 | Denver, Colorado |
| | | Field | | C/RW |
| | | John W. Gillett | Sophomore | R |
| | (United States) | Frank A. McNamee Jr. | Freshman | D | | | 1892-12-17 | Albany, New York |
| | (United States) | Sidney M. Michael (C) | Junior | D | | | 1891-12-23 | Buffalo, New York |
| | | Winthrop Swain | Junior | LW |

== Standings ==
1911–12 Collegiate ice hockey standings
| | Intercollegiate | | | | | | | Overall | | | | | |
| | GP | W | L | T | PCT. | GF | GA | GP | W | L | T | GF | GA |
|---|---|---|---|---|---|---|---|---|---|---|---|---|---|
| Amherst | – | – | – | – | – | – | – | 7 | 2 | 4 | 1 | – | – |
| Army | 5 | 2 | 2 | 1 | .500 | 9 | 19 | 5 | 2 | 2 | 1 | 9 | 19 |
| Columbia | 4 | 3 | 1 | 0 | .750 | 20 | 16 | 4 | 3 | 1 | 0 | 20 | 16 |
| Connecticut Agricultural | 1 | 0 | 1 | 0 | .000 | 0 | 10 | 2 | 1 | 1 | 0 | 2 | 10 |
| Cornell | 9 | 3 | 6 | 0 | .333 | 24 | 27 | 12 | 5 | 7 | 0 | 40 | 37 |
| Dartmouth | 5 | 0 | 5 | 0 | .000 | 12 | 35 | 5 | 0 | 5 | 0 | 12 | 35 |
| Harvard | 8 | 5 | 3 | 0 | .625 | 26 | 19 | 10 | 7 | 3 | 0 | 36 | 21 |
| Massachusetts Agricultural | 7 | 5 | 1 | 1 | .786 | 33 | 9 | 7 | 5 | 1 | 1 | 33 | 9 |
| MIT | 6 | 5 | 1 | 0 | .833 | 32 | 7 | 10 | 6 | 4 | 0 | 43 | 24 |
| Norwich | – | – | – | – | – | – | – | – | – | – | – | – | – |
| Notre Dame | 0 | 0 | 0 | 0 | – | 0 | 0 | 1 | 1 | 0 | 0 | 7 | 1 |
| Princeton | 10 | 8 | 2 | 0 | .800 | 63 | 16 | 10 | 8 | 2 | 0 | 63 | 16 |
| Rensselaer | 5 | 1 | 3 | 1 | .300 | 5 | 14 | 6 | 2 | 3 | 1 | 10 | 15 |
| Rochester | – | – | – | – | – | – | – | – | – | – | – | – | – |
| Springfield Training | – | – | – | – | – | – | – | – | – | – | – | – | – |
| Stevens Tech | – | – | – | – | – | – | – | – | – | – | – | – | – |
| Syracuse | – | – | – | – | – | – | – | – | – | – | – | – | – |
| Trinity | – | – | – | – | – | – | – | – | – | – | – | – | – |
| Williams | 6 | 1 | 4 | 1 | .250 | 10 | 29 | 7 | 2 | 4 | 1 | 11 | 29 |
| Yale | 16 | 9 | 7 | 0 | .563 | 41 | 46 | 18 | 11 | 7 | 0 | 46 | 49 |

== Schedule and results ==
| Date | Opponent | Site | Result | Record |
Regular Season
| December 21 | vs. Princeton* | St. Nicholas Rink • New York, New York | L 0–14 | 0–1–0 |
| January 13 | Massachusetts Agricultural* | Weston Field Rink • Williamstown, Massachusetts | T 2–2 | 0–1–1 |
| January 20 | Springfield Training* | Weston Field Rink • Williamstown, Massachusetts | L 2–3 | 0–2–1 |
| January 27 | at Amherst* | Pratt Field Rink • Amherst, Massachusetts | W 5–1 | 1–2–1 |
| February 17 | Amherst* | Weston Field Rink • Williamstown, Massachusetts | L 0–3 | 1–3–1 |
| February 19 | at MIT* | Boston Arena • Boston, Massachusetts | L 1–6 | 1–4–1 |
| February 24 | at Louden Field Club* | Fort William Henry Hotel Rink • Lake George, New York | W 1–0 | 2–4–1 |
*Non-conference game.
