= 1911–12 Notre Dame men's ice hockey season =

- Conference: Independent

Record
- Overall: 1–0–0
- Road: 1–0–0

Coaches and captains
- Captain: None

The 1911–12 Notre Dame men's ice hockey season was the inaugural season of play for the program.

== Season ==
A year after Yale and Cornell played the first intercollegiate games held west of Cleveland, Notre Dame officially played its first ice hockey game. The team played only a single contest, against the Culver Military Academy in nearby Culver, Indiana, winning 7–1. Notre Dame's closest competition would have been Case or Western Reserve but both programs had ceased operation after the 1910–11 season while all western Pennsylvania schools had suspended their ice hockey teams in 1910. This left Notre Dame with no regional contemporaries to compete against and led to their abbreviated schedule.

Note: Notre Dame was not officially known as the 'Fighting Irish' until 1919.

== Roster ==
No.	Nat.	Player	Class	Pos	Height	Weight	DoB	Hometown	Previous team

== Standings ==
1911–12 Collegiate ice hockey standings
	Intercollegiate							Overall					
	GP	W	L	T	PCT.	GF	GA	GP	W	L	T	GF	GA
Amherst	–	–	–	–	–	–	–	7	2	4	1	–	–
Army	5	2	2	1	.500	9	19	5	2	2	1	9	19
Columbia	4	3	1	0	.750	20	16	4	3	1	0	20	16
Connecticut Agricultural	1	0	1	0	.000	0	10	2	1	1	0	2	10
Cornell	9	3	6	0	.333	24	27	12	5	7	0	40	37
Dartmouth	5	0	5	0	.000	12	35	5	0	5	0	12	35
Harvard	8	5	3	0	.625	26	19	10	7	3	0	36	21
Massachusetts Agricultural	7	5	1	1	.786	33	9	7	5	1	1	33	9
MIT	6	5	1	0	.833	32	7	10	6	4	0	43	24
Norwich	–	–	–	–	–	–	–	–	–	–	–	–	–
Notre Dame	0	0	0	0	–	0	0	1	1	0	0	7	1
Princeton	10	8	2	0	.800	63	16	10	8	2	0	63	16
Rensselaer	5	1	3	1	.300	5	14	6	2	3	1	10	15
Rochester	–	–	–	–	–	–	–	–	–	–	–	–	–
Springfield Training	–	–	–	–	–	–	–	–	–	–	–	–	–
Stevens Tech	–	–	–	–	–	–	–	–	–	–	–	–	–
Syracuse	–	–	–	–	–	–	–	–	–	–	–	–	–
Trinity	–	–	–	–	–	–	–	–	–	–	–	–	–
Williams	6	1	4	1	.250	10	29	7	2	4	1	11	29
Yale	16	9	7	0	.563	41	46	18	11	7	0	46	49

== Schedule and results ==
Date	Opponent	Site	Result	Record
Regular Season
February 3	at Culver Military Academy	Lake Maxinkuckee • Culver, Indiana	W 7–1	1–0–0 (1–0–0)
*Non-conference game.
