= 1911–12 Army Cadets men's ice hockey season =

9th season of play for the program

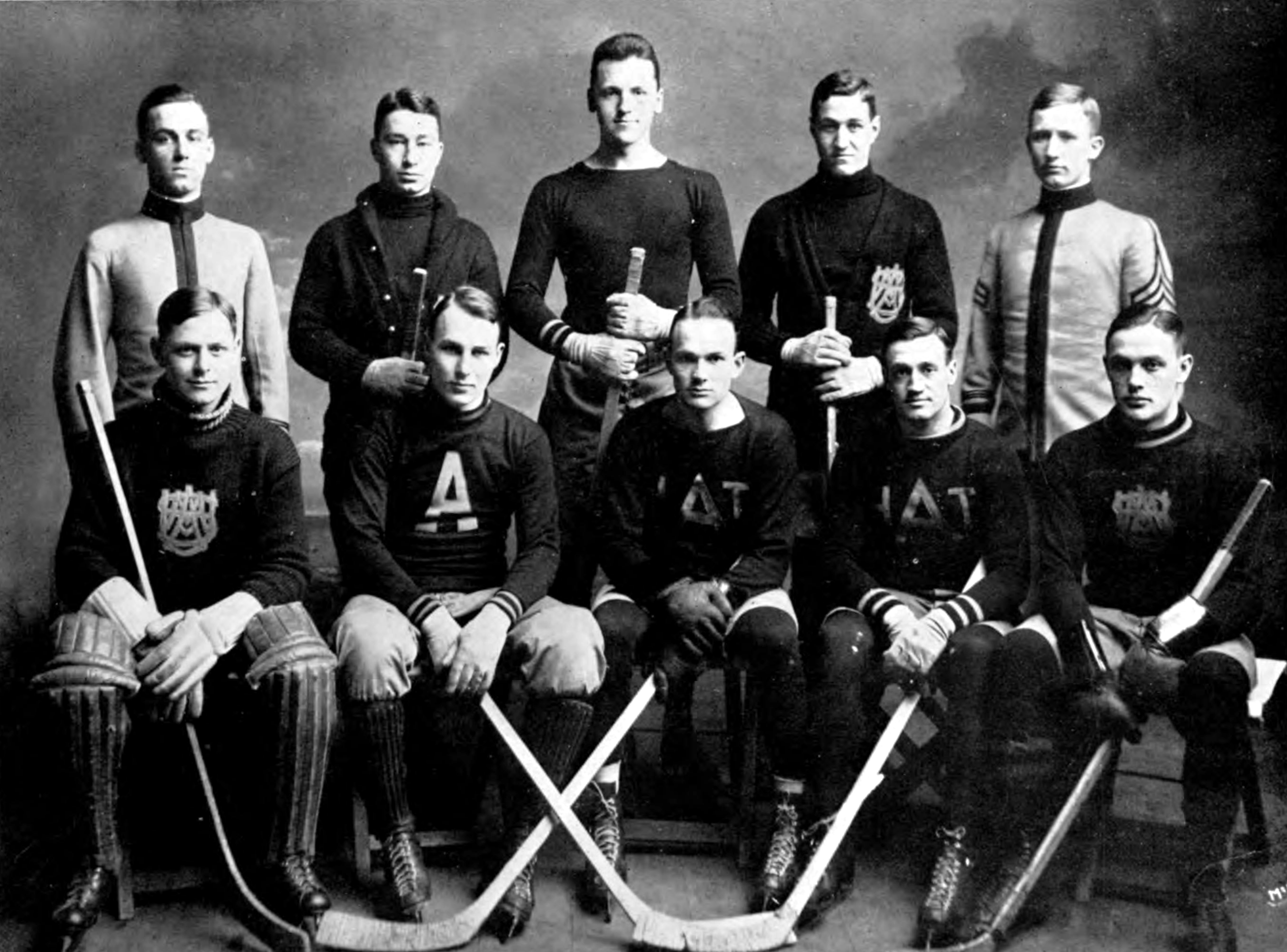
- Conference: Independent
- Home ice: Lusk Reservoir

Record
- Overall: 2–1–1

Coaches and captains
- Head coach: Leroy Bartlett
- Captain: Millard Harmon

The 1911–12 Army Cadets men's ice hockey season was the 9th season of play for the program.

== Roster ==
No.	Nat.	Player	Class	Pos	Height	Weight	DoB	Hometown	Previous team
		Oscar J. Gatchell	Senior	G			1888-12-27	Rhode Island
	(United States)	Millard Harmon Jr. (C)	Senior	R			1888-01-19	Fort Mason, California
	(United States)	Arthur R. Harris	Sophomore	RW			1890-08-01	Norfolk, Nebraska
	(United States)	William Rosevear Jr.	Junior	RW			1890-02-27	Michigan
	(United States)	Ralph Royce	Sophomore	D			1890-06-28	Marquette, Michigan
	(United States)	Frank V. Schneider	Senior	C			1887-12-03	New York
	(United States)	Franklin C. Sibert	Senior	D			1891-01-03	Bowling Green, Kentucky
	(United States)	Joseph W. Viner	Junior	LW			1889-02-16	Pennsylvania

== Standings ==
1911–12 Collegiate ice hockey standings
	Intercollegiate							Overall					
	GP	W	L	T	PCT.	GF	GA	GP	W	L	T	GF	GA
Amherst	–	–	–	–	–	–	–	7	2	4	1	–	–
Army	5	2	2	1	.500	9	19	5	2	2	1	9	19
Columbia	4	3	1	0	.750	20	16	4	3	1	0	20	16
Connecticut Agricultural	1	0	1	0	.000	0	10	2	1	1	0	2	10
Cornell	9	3	6	0	.333	24	27	12	5	7	0	40	37
Dartmouth	5	0	5	0	.000	12	35	5	0	5	0	12	35
Harvard	8	5	3	0	.625	26	19	10	7	3	0	36	21
Massachusetts Agricultural	7	5	1	1	.786	33	9	7	5	1	1	33	9
MIT	6	5	1	0	.833	32	7	10	6	4	0	43	24
Norwich	–	–	–	–	–	–	–	–	–	–	–	–	–
Notre Dame	0	0	0	0	–	0	0	1	1	0	0	7	1
Princeton	10	8	2	0	.800	63	16	10	8	2	0	63	16
Rensselaer	5	1	3	1	.300	5	14	6	2	3	1	10	15
Rochester	–	–	–	–	–	–	–	–	–	–	–	–	–
Springfield Training	–	–	–	–	–	–	–	–	–	–	–	–	–
Stevens Tech	–	–	–	–	–	–	–	–	–	–	–	–	–
Syracuse	–	–	–	–	–	–	–	–	–	–	–	–	–
Trinity	–	–	–	–	–	–	–	–	–	–	–	–	–
Williams	6	1	4	1	.250	10	29	7	2	4	1	11	29
Yale	16	9	7	0	.563	41	46	18	11	7	0	46	49

== Schedule and results ==
Date	Opponent	Site	Result	Record
Regular Season
	Stevens Tech*	Lusk Reservoir • West Point, New York	W 5–0	1–0–0
January 13	Rensselaer*	Lusk Reservoir • West Point, New York	W 2–1	2–0–0
January 27	MIT*	Lusk Reservoir • West Point, New York	L 0–10	2–1–0
	Amherst*	Lusk Reservoir • West Point, New York	T 1–1	2–1–1
February 10	Massachusetts Agricultural*	Lusk Reservoir • West Point, New York	L 1–7	2–2–1
*Non-conference game.
