= 1911–12 Dartmouth men's ice hockey season =

- Conference: 5th IHA
- Home ice: Occom Pond

Record
- Overall: 0–5–0
- Conference: 0–4–0
- Road: 0–3–0
- Neutral: 0–2–0

Coaches and captains
- Head coach: W. Rawley
- Captain: Carl Wells

The 1911–12 Dartmouth men's ice hockey season was the 7th season of play for the program.

== Season ==
The continued instability with the head coach didn't help the Greens as they suffered the worst loss in program history to Princeton. The never properly recovered and finished the season without a win for the only time in school history (as of 2020).

Note: Dartmouth College did not possess a moniker for its athletic teams until the 1920s, however, the university had adopted 'Dartmouth Green' as its school color in 1866.

== Roster ==
No.	Nat.	Player	Class	Pos	Height	Weight	DoB	Hometown	Previous team
		Gardner P. Bullard	Senior	D
	(United States)	John L. Dellinger	Sophomore	D			1890-12-17	Saint Paul, Minnesota
	(United States)	Howard Fahey	Freshman	F	5' 7" (1.7 m)	146 lb (66 kg)	1892-06-24	Medford, Massachusetts
		Harold T. Johnson	Sophomore	F
		Edward B. Luitwieler	Junior	F			1890-07-20
	(United States)	William H. Mason	Junior	F				Boston, Massachusetts
		Charles E. McCarthy	Senior	G
		Raymond M. Schulte	Junior	F
	(United States)	Henry Taylor	Junior	G			1890-12-07	Brooklyn, New York
	(United States)	Leon P. Tuck	Freshman	F	5' 9" (1.75 m)	181 lb (82 kg)	1891-05-25	Winchester, Massachusetts
	(United States)	Clarence L. Wanamaker	Freshman	RW			1892-08-03	Melrose, Massachusetts
	(United States)	Carl S. Wells (C)	Senior	LW			1890-02-04	Natick, Massachusetts

== Standings ==
1911–12 Collegiate ice hockey standings
	Intercollegiate							Overall					
	GP	W	L	T	PCT.	GF	GA	GP	W	L	T	GF	GA
Amherst	–	–	–	–	–	–	–	7	2	4	1	–	–
Army	5	2	2	1	.500	9	19	5	2	2	1	9	19
Columbia	4	3	1	0	.750	20	16	4	3	1	0	20	16
Connecticut Agricultural	1	0	1	0	.000	0	10	2	1	1	0	2	10
Cornell	9	3	6	0	.333	24	27	12	5	7	0	40	37
Dartmouth	5	0	5	0	.000	12	35	5	0	5	0	12	35
Harvard	8	5	3	0	.625	26	19	10	7	3	0	36	21
Massachusetts Agricultural	7	5	1	1	.786	33	9	7	5	1	1	33	9
MIT	6	5	1	0	.833	32	7	10	6	4	0	43	24
Norwich	–	–	–	–	–	–	–	–	–	–	–	–	–
Notre Dame	0	0	0	0	–	0	0	1	1	0	0	7	1
Princeton	10	8	2	0	.800	63	16	10	8	2	0	63	16
Rensselaer	5	1	3	1	.300	5	14	6	2	3	1	10	15
Rochester	–	–	–	–	–	–	–	–	–	–	–	–	–
Springfield Training	–	–	–	–	–	–	–	–	–	–	–	–	–
Stevens Tech	–	–	–	–	–	–	–	–	–	–	–	–	–
Syracuse	–	–	–	–	–	–	–	–	–	–	–	–	–
Trinity	–	–	–	–	–	–	–	–	–	–	–	–	–
Williams	6	1	4	1	.250	10	29	7	2	4	1	11	29
Yale	16	9	7	0	.563	41	46	18	11	7	0	46	49

1911–12 Intercollegiate Hockey Association standings
	Conference							Overall					
	GP	W	L	T	PTS	GF	GA	GP	W	L	T	GF	GA
Princeton *	4	4	0	0	8	30	4	10	8	2	0	63	16
Columbia	4	3	1	0	6	20	16	4	3	1	0	20	16
Yale	4	2	2	0	4	11	15	18	11	7	0	46	49
Cornell	4	1	3	0	2	8	16	12	5	7	0	40	37
Dartmouth	4	0	4	0	0	9	28	5	0	5	0	12	35
* indicates conference champion

== Schedule and results ==
Date	Opponent	Site	Result	Record
Regular Season
January 6	vs. Princeton	Boston Arena • Boston, Massachusetts	L 0–14	0–1–0 (0–1–0)
January 15	at Columbia	St. Nicholas Rink • New York, New York	L 4–5	0–2–0 (0–2–0)
February 9	at Harvard*	Boston Arena • Boston, Massachusetts	L 3–7	0–3–0
February 14	at Yale	Yale Rink • New Haven, Connecticut	L 3–4	0–4–0 (0–3–0)
February 17	vs. Cornell	Arena Ice Rink • Syracuse, New York	L 2–5	0–5–0 (0–4–0)
*Non-conference game.
