= 1911–12 RPI men's ice hockey season =

- Conference: Independent

Record
- Overall: 2–3–1
- Home: 1–1–0
- Road: 1–2–1

Coaches and captains
- Captain: Edward Dion

The 1911–12 RPI men's ice hockey season was the 9th season of play for the program.

== Season ==
After starting the season extending the team's consecutive losses to 7, Rensselaer recovered in the final two games of the year.

Note: Rensselaer's athletic teams were unofficially known as 'Cherry and White' until 1921 when the Engineers moniker debuted for the men's basketball team.

== Roster ==
No.	Nat.	Player	Class	Pos	Height	Weight	DoB	Hometown	Previous team
		Edward Dion (C)

== Standings ==
1911–12 Collegiate ice hockey standings
	Intercollegiate							Overall					
	GP	W	L	T	PCT.	GF	GA	GP	W	L	T	GF	GA
Amherst	–	–	–	–	–	–	–	7	2	4	1	–	–
Army	5	2	2	1	.500	9	19	5	2	2	1	9	19
Columbia	4	3	1	0	.750	20	16	4	3	1	0	20	16
Connecticut Agricultural	1	0	1	0	.000	0	10	2	1	1	0	2	10
Cornell	9	3	6	0	.333	24	27	12	5	7	0	40	37
Dartmouth	5	0	5	0	.000	12	35	5	0	5	0	12	35
Harvard	8	5	3	0	.625	26	19	10	7	3	0	36	21
Massachusetts Agricultural	7	5	1	1	.786	33	9	7	5	1	1	33	9
MIT	6	5	1	0	.833	32	7	10	6	4	0	43	24
Norwich	–	–	–	–	–	–	–	–	–	–	–	–	–
Notre Dame	0	0	0	0	–	0	0	1	1	0	0	7	1
Princeton	10	8	2	0	.800	63	16	10	8	2	0	63	16
Rensselaer	5	1	3	1	.300	5	14	6	2	3	1	10	15
Rochester	–	–	–	–	–	–	–	–	–	–	–	–	–
Springfield Training	–	–	–	–	–	–	–	–	–	–	–	–	–
Stevens Tech	–	–	–	–	–	–	–	–	–	–	–	–	–
Syracuse	–	–	–	–	–	–	–	–	–	–	–	–	–
Trinity	–	–	–	–	–	–	–	–	–	–	–	–	–
Williams	6	1	4	1	.250	10	29	7	2	4	1	11	29
Yale	16	9	7	0	.563	41	46	18	11	7	0	46	49

== Schedule and results ==
Date	Opponent	Site	Result	Record
Regular Season
January 6	Massachusetts Agricultural College*	Troy, New York	L 0–4	0–1–0
January 13	at Army*	Lusk Reservoir • West Point, New York	L 1–2	0–2–0
January 27	Springfield Training*	Troy, New York	L 1–6	0–3–0
February 10	at Syracuse*	Arena Ice Rink • Syracuse, New York	W 3–2	1–3–0
February 17	at Lake George Hockey Club*	Fort William Henry Hotel Rink • Lake George, New York	W 5–1	2–3–0
February 24	Syracuse*	Troy, New York	T 0–0 ^{OT}	2–3–1
*Non-conference game.
