= 1911–12 MIT Engineers men's ice hockey season =

- Conference: Independent
- Home ice: Boston Arena

Record
- Overall: 6–4–0
- Home: 1–2–0
- Road: 4–1–0
- Neutral: 1–1–0

Coaches and captains
- Head coach: R. C. Clifford
- Captain: Vernon Sloan

The 1911–12 MIT Engineers men's ice hockey season was the 13th season of play for the program.

== Season ==
Alfred Ranney served as team manager.

Note: Massachusetts Institute of Technology athletics were referred to as 'Engineers' or 'Techmen' during the first two decades of the 20th century. By 1920, all sports programs had adopted the Engineer moniker.

== Roster ==
No.	Nat.	Player	Class	Pos	Height	Weight	DoB	Hometown	Previous team
		William N. Eichorn	Junior	D
		Ralph L. Fletcher	Freshman	D
		Frederick L. Hurlbutt	Sophomore	F
		Norman D. MacLeod	Junior	F
		Alfred G. Ranney	Junior	G
		Vernon G. Sloan (C)	Senior	F
		Harold G. Storke	Sophomore	F
		Carl L. Stucklen	Junior	D
		Alexander W. Yereance	Senior	F

== Standings ==
1911–12 Collegiate ice hockey standings
	Intercollegiate							Overall					
	GP	W	L	T	PCT.	GF	GA	GP	W	L	T	GF	GA
Amherst	–	–	–	–	–	–	–	7	2	4	1	–	–
Army	5	2	2	1	.500	9	19	5	2	2	1	9	19
Columbia	4	3	1	0	.750	20	16	4	3	1	0	20	16
Connecticut Agricultural	1	0	1	0	.000	0	10	2	1	1	0	2	10
Cornell	9	3	6	0	.333	24	27	12	5	7	0	40	37
Dartmouth	5	0	5	0	.000	12	35	5	0	5	0	12	35
Harvard	8	5	3	0	.625	26	19	10	7	3	0	36	21
Massachusetts Agricultural	7	5	1	1	.786	33	9	7	5	1	1	33	9
MIT	6	5	1	0	.833	32	7	10	6	4	0	43	24
Norwich	–	–	–	–	–	–	–	–	–	–	–	–	–
Notre Dame	0	0	0	0	–	0	0	1	1	0	0	7	1
Princeton	10	8	2	0	.800	63	16	10	8	2	0	63	16
Rensselaer	5	1	3	1	.300	5	14	6	2	3	1	10	15
Rochester	–	–	–	–	–	–	–	–	–	–	–	–	–
Springfield Training	–	–	–	–	–	–	–	–	–	–	–	–	–
Stevens Tech	–	–	–	–	–	–	–	–	–	–	–	–	–
Syracuse	–	–	–	–	–	–	–	–	–	–	–	–	–
Trinity	–	–	–	–	–	–	–	–	–	–	–	–	–
Williams	6	1	4	1	.250	10	29	7	2	4	1	11	29
Yale	16	9	7	0	.563	41	46	18	11	7	0	46	49

== Schedule and results ==
Date	Opponent	Site	Result	Record
Regular Season
November 18	vs. Boston Athletic Association*	Boston Arena • Boston, Massachusetts	L 2–6	0–1–0
November 25	Intercolonials*	Boston Arena • Boston, Massachusetts	L 1–3	0–2–0
December 2	Intercolonials*	Boston Arena • Boston, Massachusetts	L 3–6	0–3–0
December 21	vs. Harvard*	Boston Arena • Boston, Massachusetts	W 4–1	1–3–0
January 13	at Yale*	New Haven, Connecticut	L 3–5	1–4–0
January 25	at Syracuse Hockey Club*	Arena Ice Rink • Syracuse, New York	W 5–2	2–4–0
January 26	at Syracuse*	Arena Ice Rink • Syracuse, New York	W 5–0	3–4–0
January 27	at Army*	West Point, New York	W 10–0	4–4–0
February 10	at Amherst*	Pratt Field Rink • Amherst, Massachusetts	W 4–0	5–4–0
February 16	at Massachusetts Agricultural*	Amherst, Massachusetts (Exhibition †)	L 1–4	
February 19	Williams*	Boston Arena • Boston, Massachusetts	W 6–1	6–4–0
*Non-conference game.

† Mass Ag and MIT agreed not to count the game due to the extremely poor condition of the ice.
