= Alexander Salvini =

Italian actor (1861–1896)

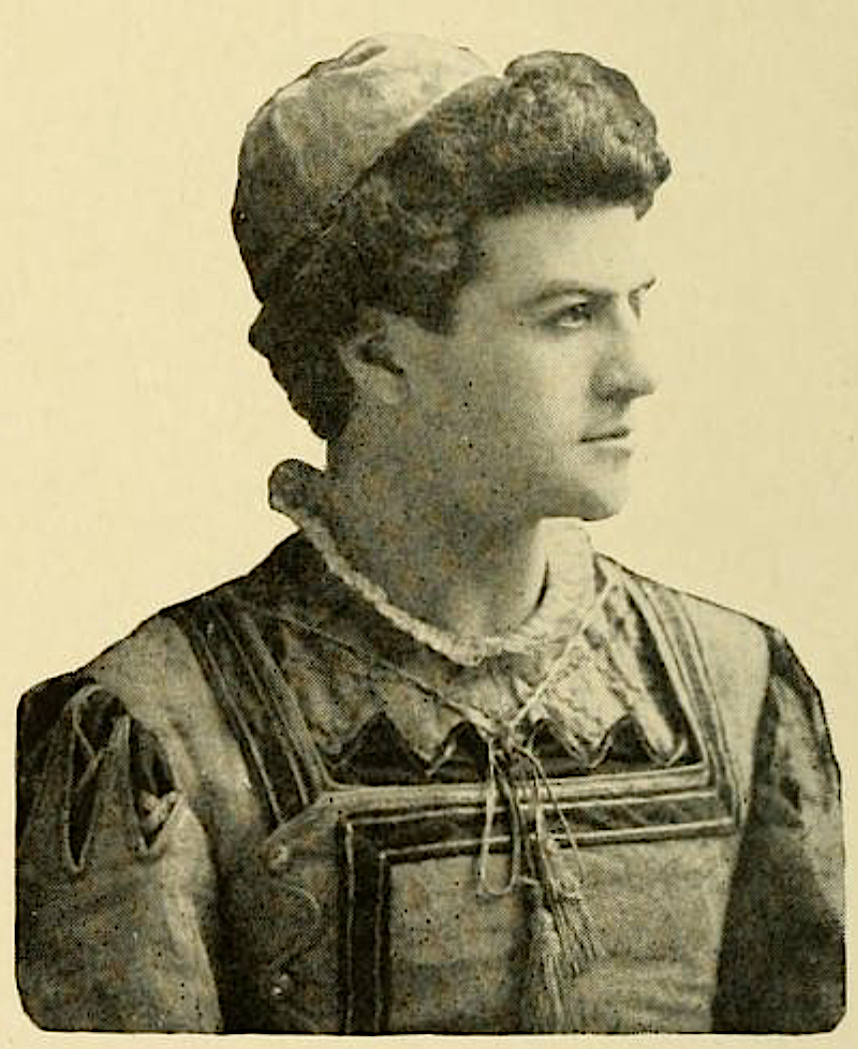
Alexander Salvini in c. 1884

Alexander Salvini (born Alessandro Salvini, December 21, 1861 – December 15, 1896) was an Italian actor and a member of the Salvini family of actors. He spent the majority of his acting career working in America, and became a celebrity in the United States. He was active on the stage from February 1882 through the Spring 1896. In the last year of his stage career he battled illness after contracting typhoid fever while performing in Canada. He returned to Italy in the Summer of 1896 where he lived for the last months of his life. He married the actress Maud Dixon Salvini a few months before dying at the age of 34.

== Life and career ==
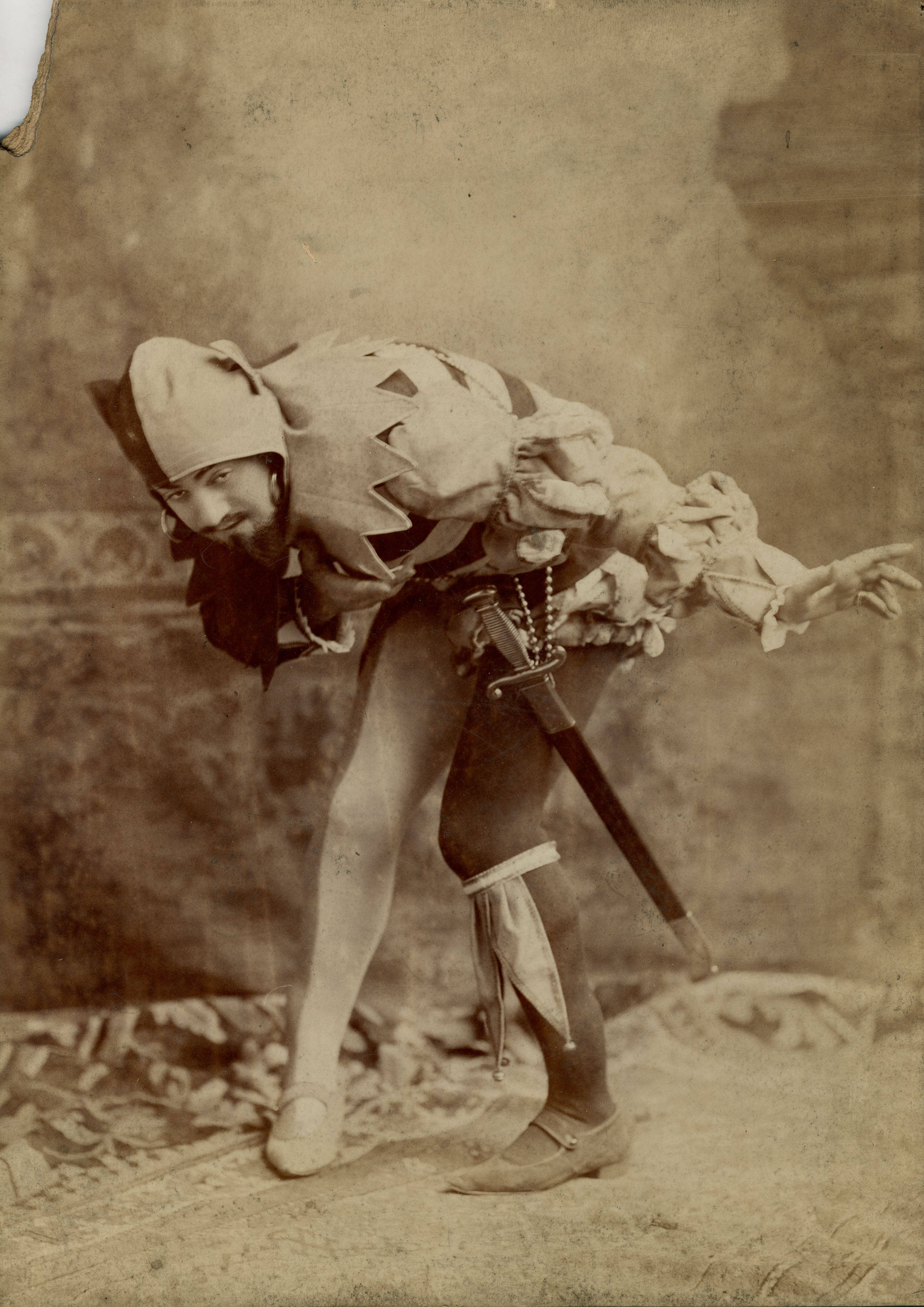
Alexander Salvini

The third son of actor Tommaso Salvini and actress Clementina Cazzola, Alexander Salvini was born in Rome on December 21, 1861. He was part of the Salvini family of actors that extended back several generations. He was educated in schools in Genoa, Florence, and Naples and trained as an engineer at a technical school in Switzerland. He traveled to the United States with the actor Ernesto Rossi in 1881; initially with the intent of finding work as an engineer in America.

Salvini decided to forgo an engineering career and followed his parents in their profession. He studied English diligently in order to prepare himself for an acting career in the United States. He made his debut on the American stage in February 1882 as George Duhamel in Adolphe Belot's L’Article 47 in a cast led by Clara Morris. He spent the next two seasons touring in Margaret Mather's theatre troupe. One of the roles he played in her troupe was Romeo in Romeo and Juliet.

In 1885-1886 he toured the United States with his father, after which he toured for three years in a company managed by A. M. Palmer. He was particularly admired for his portrayals of the title characters in Shakespeare's Hamlet and Othello. In his later career he worked under theatrical manager W. M. Wilkison. He was well known for his portrayal of d'Artagnan in The Three Musketeers.

In 1895 Salvini became ill with typhoid fever while performing in Montreal, Canada, and cancelled several engagements. He was not fully recovered when he appeared at the Boston Museum in the Spring of 1896. After this he returned to his father's home in Italy to attempt to recuperate. He died in Florence from his illness on December 15, 1896. He married the American actress Maud Dixon a few months before he died at the age of 34 shortly before his 35th birthday.
