= 1911–12 Massachusetts Agricultural Aggies men's ice hockey season =

- Home ice: Campus Pond

Record
- Overall: 5–1–1

Coaches and captains
- Captain: Curtis Peckham

The 1911–12 Massachusetts Agricultural Aggies men's ice hockey season was the 4th season of play for the program.

== Season ==
Mass Ag produced a stellar record for the second consecutive season. The team won most of their games handily, placing themselves at the top of the heap for teams outside the Ivy League.

== Roster ==
No.	Nat.	Player	Class	Pos	Height	Weight	DoB	Hometown	Previous team
		Arthur J. Ackerman	Senior
		John G. Hutchinson	Sophomore
		Dettmar W. Jones	Sophomore
		Willard S. Little	Junior
		Lester W. Needham	Sophomore
		Curtis Peckham (C)	Senior
		William C. Sanctuary	Senior				1888-10-16
		Herman C. Walker	Senior
		Harold C. Woolley	Sophomore

== Standings ==
1911–12 Collegiate ice hockey standings
	Intercollegiate							Overall					
	GP	W	L	T	PCT.	GF	GA	GP	W	L	T	GF	GA
Amherst	–	–	–	–	–	–	–	7	2	4	1	–	–
Army	5	2	2	1	.500	9	19	5	2	2	1	9	19
Columbia	4	3	1	0	.750	20	16	4	3	1	0	20	16
Connecticut Agricultural	1	0	1	0	.000	0	10	2	1	1	0	2	10
Cornell	9	3	6	0	.333	24	27	12	5	7	0	40	37
Dartmouth	5	0	5	0	.000	12	35	5	0	5	0	12	35
Harvard	8	5	3	0	.625	26	19	10	7	3	0	36	21
Massachusetts Agricultural	7	5	1	1	.786	33	9	7	5	1	1	33	9
MIT	6	5	1	0	.833	32	7	10	6	4	0	43	24
Norwich	–	–	–	–	–	–	–	–	–	–	–	–	–
Notre Dame	0	0	0	0	–	0	0	1	1	0	0	7	1
Princeton	10	8	2	0	.800	63	16	10	8	2	0	63	16
Rensselaer	5	1	3	1	.300	5	14	6	2	3	1	10	15
Rochester	–	–	–	–	–	–	–	–	–	–	–	–	–
Springfield Training	–	–	–	–	–	–	–	–	–	–	–	–	–
Stevens Tech	–	–	–	–	–	–	–	–	–	–	–	–	–
Syracuse	–	–	–	–	–	–	–	–	–	–	–	–	–
Trinity	–	–	–	–	–	–	–	–	–	–	–	–	–
Williams	6	1	4	1	.250	10	29	7	2	4	1	11	29
Yale	16	9	7	0	.563	41	46	18	11	7	0	46	49

== Schedule and results ==
Date	Opponent	Site	Result	Record
Regular Season
January 6	at Rensselaer*	Troy, New York	W 4–0	1–0–0
January 13	at Williams*	Weston Field Rink • Williamstown, Massachusetts	T 2–2	1–0–1
January 17	Springfield Training*		W 8–2	2–0–1
January 27	Trinity*		W 9–1	3–0–1
February 10	at Army*	Lusk Reservoir • West Point, New York	W 7–1	4–0–1
February 14	vs. Amherst*	Amherst, Massachusetts	W 3–0	5–0–1
February 16	MIT*	Amherst, Massachusetts (Exhibition †)	W 4–1	
February 24	at Yale*	Yale Rink • New Haven, Connecticut	L 0–3	5–1–1
*Non-conference game.

† Mass Ag and MIT agreed not to count the game due to the extremely poor condition of the ice.
