= 1911–12 Cornell Big Red men's ice hockey season =

- Conference: 4th IHA
- Home ice: Beebe Lake

Record
- Overall: 5–7–0
- Conference: 1–3–0
- Road: 1–1–0
- Neutral: 4–6–0

Coaches and captains
- Head coach: Talbot Hunter
- Captain(s): Malcolm Vail; Edward Scheu

The 1911–12 Cornell Big Red men's ice hockey season was the 11th season of play for the program.

== Season ==
With the team losing seven of the nine players from last year's championship team due to graduation, Cornell had difficult in sustaining a high level of play. The offense was particularly anemic, failing to score more than one goal in half of their games.

The team was also faced with the disadvantage of not being able to play at home. Warm weather forced the Big Red to play all of their games away from Ithaca, though most were neutral-site games in Syracuse. Even with all of the difficulties, Cornell did not play terribly. Most of their losses were close affairs and the ice time gave the new players valuable experience for the following season. The biggest loss for the team was when head coach Talbot Hunter resigned after the season.

== Roster ==
No.	Nat.	Player	Class	Pos	Height	Weight	DoB	Hometown	Previous team
	(United States)	Otho M. Clark	Sophomore	D			1889-05-07	Avon, New York
		Archie L. Dean Jr.	Junior	G			1891-08-21
		Edward A. Hill	Junior	F			1891-03-10
		Kenneth D. Means	Junior	F			1891-07-12
	(United States)	William A. More	Junior	F			1891-05-18	Buffalo, New York
	(United States)	William D. Nisbet	Junior	D
		Abram Rosenberg	Senior	F			1888-05-17
	(United States)	Edward M. Scheu	Junior	W/D			1890-08-28	Buffalo, New York
	(Canada)	Loren B. Smith	Sophomore	D				Truro, Nova Scotia
		Theodore L. Tewksbury	Sophomore	F
	(United States)	Malcolm D. Vail (C)	Senior	G			1888-10-04	Highland Park, Illinois

== Standings ==
1911–12 Collegiate ice hockey standings
	Intercollegiate							Overall					
	GP	W	L	T	PCT.	GF	GA	GP	W	L	T	GF	GA
Amherst	–	–	–	–	–	–	–	7	2	4	1	–	–
Army	5	2	2	1	.500	9	19	5	2	2	1	9	19
Columbia	4	3	1	0	.750	20	16	4	3	1	0	20	16
Connecticut Agricultural	1	0	1	0	.000	0	10	2	1	1	0	2	10
Cornell	9	3	6	0	.333	24	27	12	5	7	0	40	37
Dartmouth	5	0	5	0	.000	12	35	5	0	5	0	12	35
Harvard	8	5	3	0	.625	26	19	10	7	3	0	36	21
Massachusetts Agricultural	7	5	1	1	.786	33	9	7	5	1	1	33	9
MIT	6	5	1	0	.833	32	7	10	6	4	0	43	24
Norwich	–	–	–	–	–	–	–	–	–	–	–	–	–
Notre Dame	0	0	0	0	–	0	0	1	1	0	0	7	1
Princeton	10	8	2	0	.800	63	16	10	8	2	0	63	16
Rensselaer	5	1	3	1	.300	5	14	6	2	3	1	10	15
Rochester	–	–	–	–	–	–	–	–	–	–	–	–	–
Springfield Training	–	–	–	–	–	–	–	–	–	–	–	–	–
Stevens Tech	–	–	–	–	–	–	–	–	–	–	–	–	–
Syracuse	–	–	–	–	–	–	–	–	–	–	–	–	–
Trinity	–	–	–	–	–	–	–	–	–	–	–	–	–
Williams	6	1	4	1	.250	10	29	7	2	4	1	11	29
Yale	16	9	7	0	.563	41	46	18	11	7	0	46	49

1911–12 Intercollegiate Hockey Association standings
	Conference							Overall					
	GP	W	L	T	PTS	GF	GA	GP	W	L	T	GF	GA
Princeton *	4	4	0	0	8	30	4	10	8	2	0	63	16
Columbia	4	3	1	0	6	20	16	4	3	1	0	20	16
Yale	4	2	2	0	4	11	15	18	11	7	0	46	49
Cornell	4	1	3	0	2	8	16	12	5	7	0	40	37
Dartmouth	4	0	4	0	0	9	28	5	0	5	0	12	35
* indicates conference champion

== Schedule and results ==
Date	Opponent	Site	Result	Record
Regular season
December 22	at Syracuse Arenas*	Arena Ice Rink • Syracuse, New York	W 8–4	1–0–0
December 26	vs. Niagara Falls*	Arena Ice Rink • Syracuse, New York	W 5–2	2–0–0
December 27	vs. Niagara Falls*	Arena Ice Rink • Syracuse, New York	L 3–4	2–1–0
December 30	vs. Rochester*	Arena Ice Rink • Syracuse, New York	W 10–2	3–1–0
January 1	vs. Yale*	Arena Ice Rink • Syracuse, New York	L 1–5	3–2–0
January 2	vs. Yale*	Arena Ice Rink • Syracuse, New York	L 0–1	3–3–0
January 3	vs. Yale*	Arena Ice Rink • Syracuse, New York	W 3–0	4–3–0
January 6	vs. Columbia	Arena Ice Rink • Syracuse, New York	L 1–6	4–4–0 (0–1–0)
January 13	vs. Princeton	Arena Ice Rink • Syracuse, New York	L 1–6	4–5–0 (0–2–0)
January 20	vs. Yale	St. Nicholas Rink • New York, New York	L 1–2 ^{OT}	4–6–0 (0–3–0)
January 27	at Harvard*	Boston Arena • Boston, Massachusetts	L 2–3 ^{2OT}	4–7–0
February 17	vs. Dartmouth	Arena Ice Rink • Syracuse, New York	W 5–2	5–7–0 (1–3–0)
*Non-conference game.
