= 1911–12 United States collegiate men's ice hockey season =

- Duration: December 1911– March 1912
- Collegiate champion: Princeton

The 1911–12 United States collegiate men's ice hockey season was the 18th season of collegiate ice hockey.

== Regular season ==
=== Standings ===
1911–12 Collegiate ice hockey standings
	Intercollegiate							Overall					
	GP	W	L	T	PCT.	GF	GA	GP	W	L	T	GF	GA
Amherst	–	–	–	–	–	–	–	7	2	4	1	–	–
Army	5	2	2	1	.500	9	19	5	2	2	1	9	19
Columbia	4	3	1	0	.750	20	16	4	3	1	0	20	16
Connecticut Agricultural	1	0	1	0	.000	0	10	2	1	1	0	2	10
Cornell	9	3	6	0	.333	24	27	12	5	7	0	40	37
Dartmouth	5	0	5	0	.000	12	35	5	0	5	0	12	35
Harvard	8	5	3	0	.625	26	19	10	7	3	0	36	21
Massachusetts Agricultural	7	5	1	1	.786	33	9	7	5	1	1	33	9
MIT	6	5	1	0	.833	32	7	10	6	4	0	43	24
Norwich	–	–	–	–	–	–	–	–	–	–	–	–	–
Notre Dame	0	0	0	0	–	0	0	1	1	0	0	7	1
Princeton	10	8	2	0	.800	63	16	10	8	2	0	63	16
Rensselaer	5	1	3	1	.300	5	14	6	2	3	1	10	15
Rochester	–	–	–	–	–	–	–	–	–	–	–	–	–
Springfield Training	–	–	–	–	–	–	–	–	–	–	–	–	–
Stevens Tech	–	–	–	–	–	–	–	–	–	–	–	–	–
Syracuse	–	–	–	–	–	–	–	–	–	–	–	–	–
Trinity	–	–	–	–	–	–	–	–	–	–	–	–	–
Williams	6	1	4	1	.250	10	29	7	2	4	1	11	29
Yale	16	9	7	0	.563	41	46	18	11	7	0	46	49

1911–12 Intercollegiate Hockey Association standings
	Conference							Overall					
	GP	W	L	T	PTS	GF	GA	GP	W	L	T	GF	GA
Princeton *	4	4	0	0	8	30	4	10	8	2	0	63	16
Columbia	4	3	1	0	6	20	16	4	3	1	0	20	16
Yale	4	2	2	0	4	11	15	18	11	7	0	46	49
Cornell	4	1	3	0	2	8	16	12	5	7	0	40	37
Dartmouth	4	0	4	0	0	9	28	5	0	5	0	12	35
* indicates conference champion
