= Guido Salvini =

Guido Salvini may refer to:

- Guido Salvini (director), Italian film director
- Guido Salvini (judge), Italian judge
