= Emil Salvini =

American historian

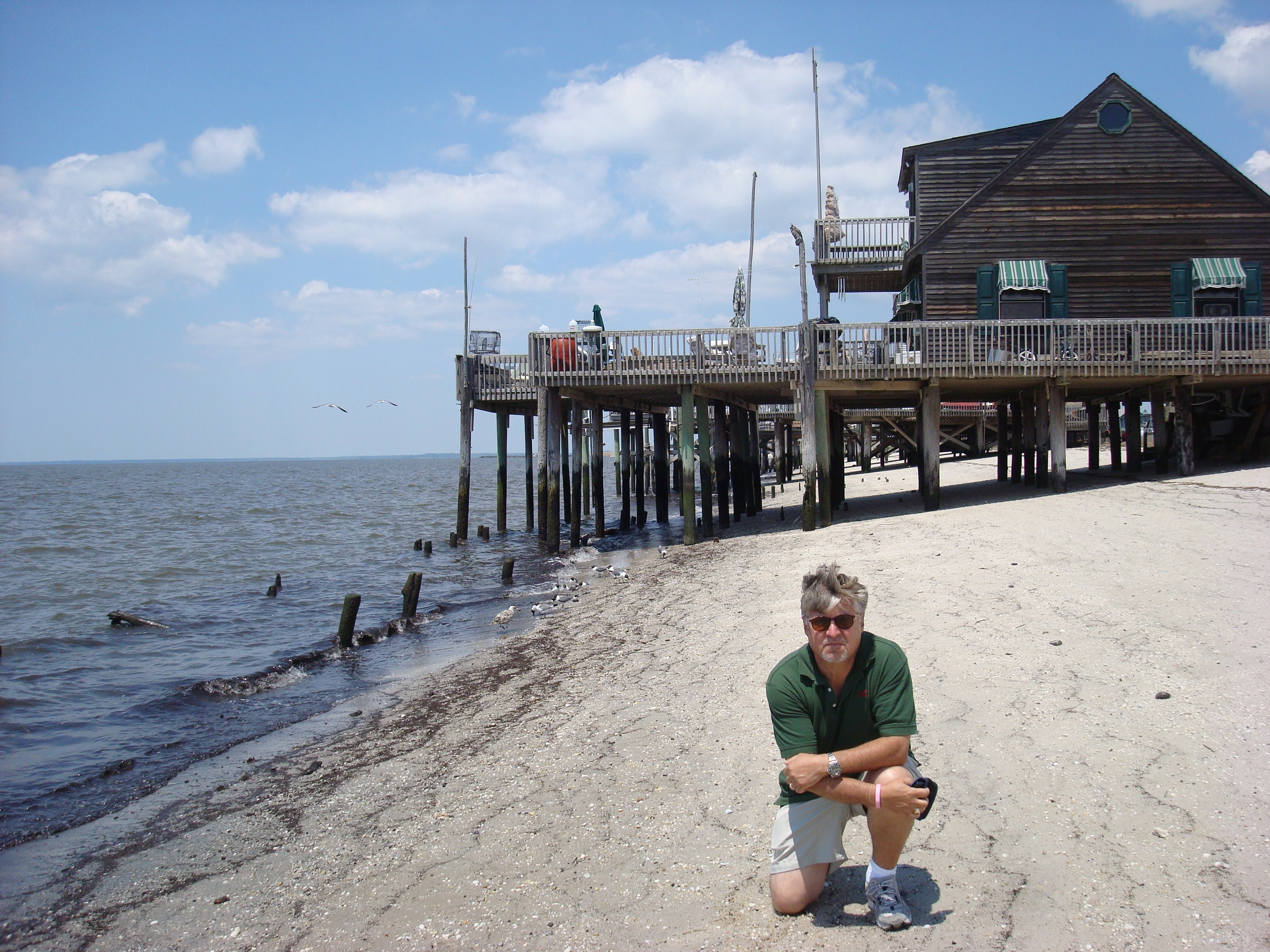
Emil R. Salvini

Emil R. Salvini is a historian/author/host of Tales of the Jersey Shore on NJTV.

Born and raised in New Jersey he has several books in print about the state's history, with an emphasis on the Jersey Shore. He is an alumnus of William Paterson University and Harvard University. In 2006, his book Hobey Baker, American Legend was honored by the New Jersey Council for the Humanities. A resident of Cape May, New Jersey, he served a full term as a member of the Cape May City Historic Preservation Commission as part of an effort to assist in preserving the city's landmark status

In April 2011 he planned a series of short segments for PBS-NJTV which resulted in six mini episodes of a show entitled Tales of the Jersey Shore. NJTV/PBS began to broadcast 12 half-hour shows of "Tales of the Jersey Shore" in the summer of 2012. In 2012–2013, Salvini along with producer Greg Russo and cameraman Joe Valenti wrote and hosted a series of half-hour and one-hour episodes that were broadcast on NJTV-PBS. They included shows on the Morro Castle; NJ's Titanic, Hurricane Sandy and the United States Life-Saving Service.

In the Summer of 2013 Emil wrote the cover story for Amtrak's Arrive Magazine, July- August 2013: A Garden State Summer and a story entitled "The legend of Peter Boyton" for Cape May magazine.

On April 16, 2015, William Paterson University honored Salvini and his wife Nancy with their 2015 Legacy Award for Alumni Leadership and Philanthropy.

On September 23, 2017, Autism Radio, a NJ 501(c)(3) non-profit organization, held a Casino Night fundraising event, where Salvini and 2 others were given the "Hope Saves the Day" award.

In 2018 Emil began his Podcast "Tales of the New Jersey Shore" with an audience of thousands of listeners. Topics range from boardwalks, shipwrecks, hurricanes, amusements and the history of each Jersey Shore resort.

== Bibliography ==
- Jersey Shore: Vintage Images of Bygone Days (2008)
- Hobey Baker, American Legend (2005)
- Boardwalk Memories: Tales of the Jersey Shore (2005)
- The Summer City by the Sea: Cape May, New Jersey--An Illustrated History (2004)
