= Maud Dixon Salvini =

British-American actress

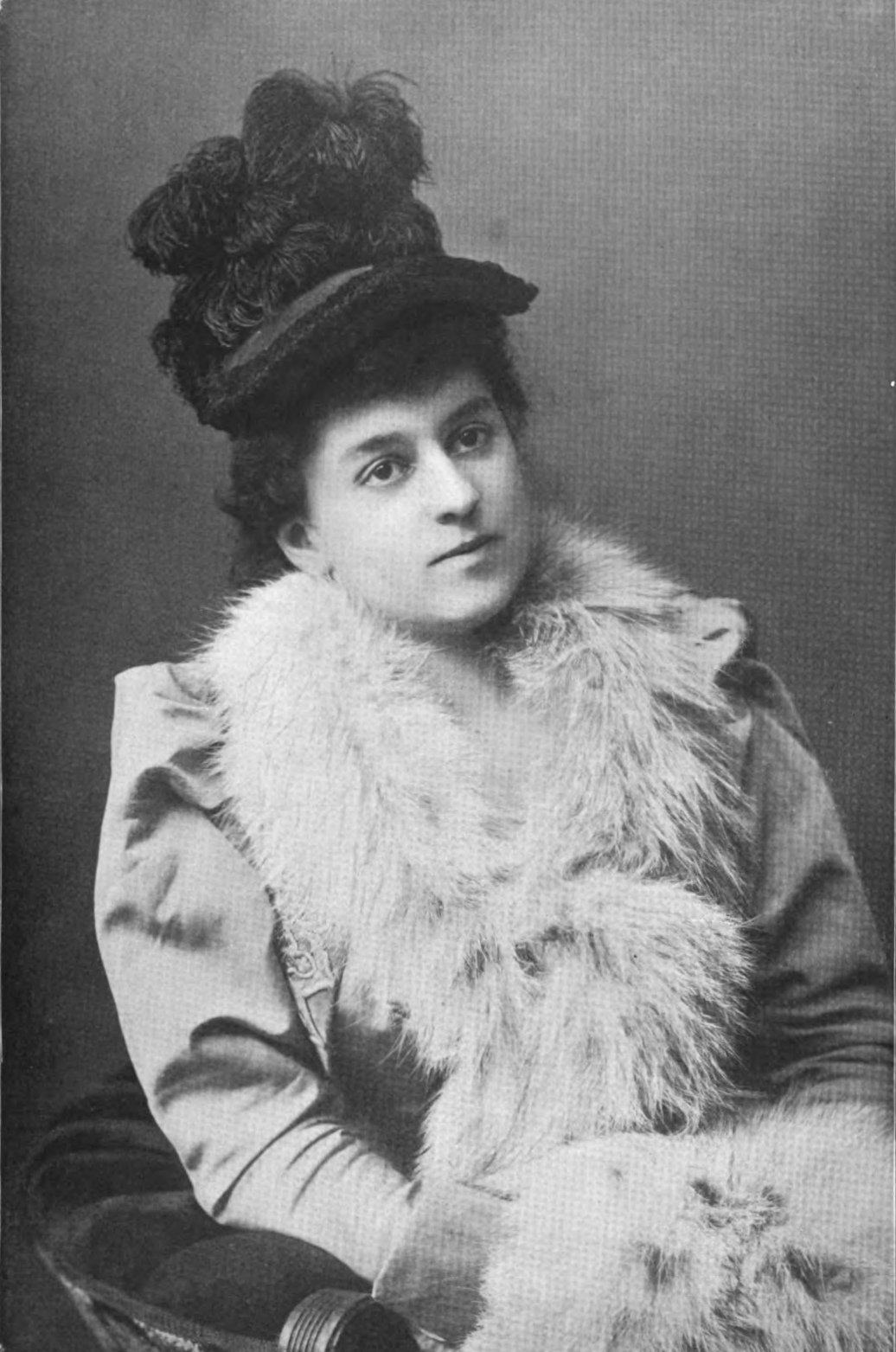
- Born: 1866; London, England, U.K.
- Died: November 25, 1944 (aged 77–78); New York, New York, U.S.
- Occupation: Actress
- Spouse: Alexander Salvini
- Relatives: Tommaso Salvini (father-in-Law); Alexander Salvini (nephew); Guido Salvini (nephew)

Maud Dixon Salvini (1866 – November 25, 1944) was an English-born American actress and playwright, based in New York City.

== Early life and education ==
Dixon was born in London and raised in Concord, New Hampshire. She studied voice at the New England Conservatory of Music with Eben Tourjée.

== Career ==
=== Acting and singing ===
Dixon's stage debut came in Boston in 1882, when she was in the first American production of the Gilbert and Sullivan opera Iolanthe. She toured United States as part of actor Tommaso Salvini's touring company, appearing in Othello and The Outlaw. With her husband, she appeared on the New York stage in The Three Musketeers (1894). "Her dramatic talents may be said, musically speaking, to be light in the middle register," according to an 1894 publication. "Strong, wild, romantic roles and just the reverse, dainty, delicate, idealistic or classic parts receive equally good interpretation at her hands."

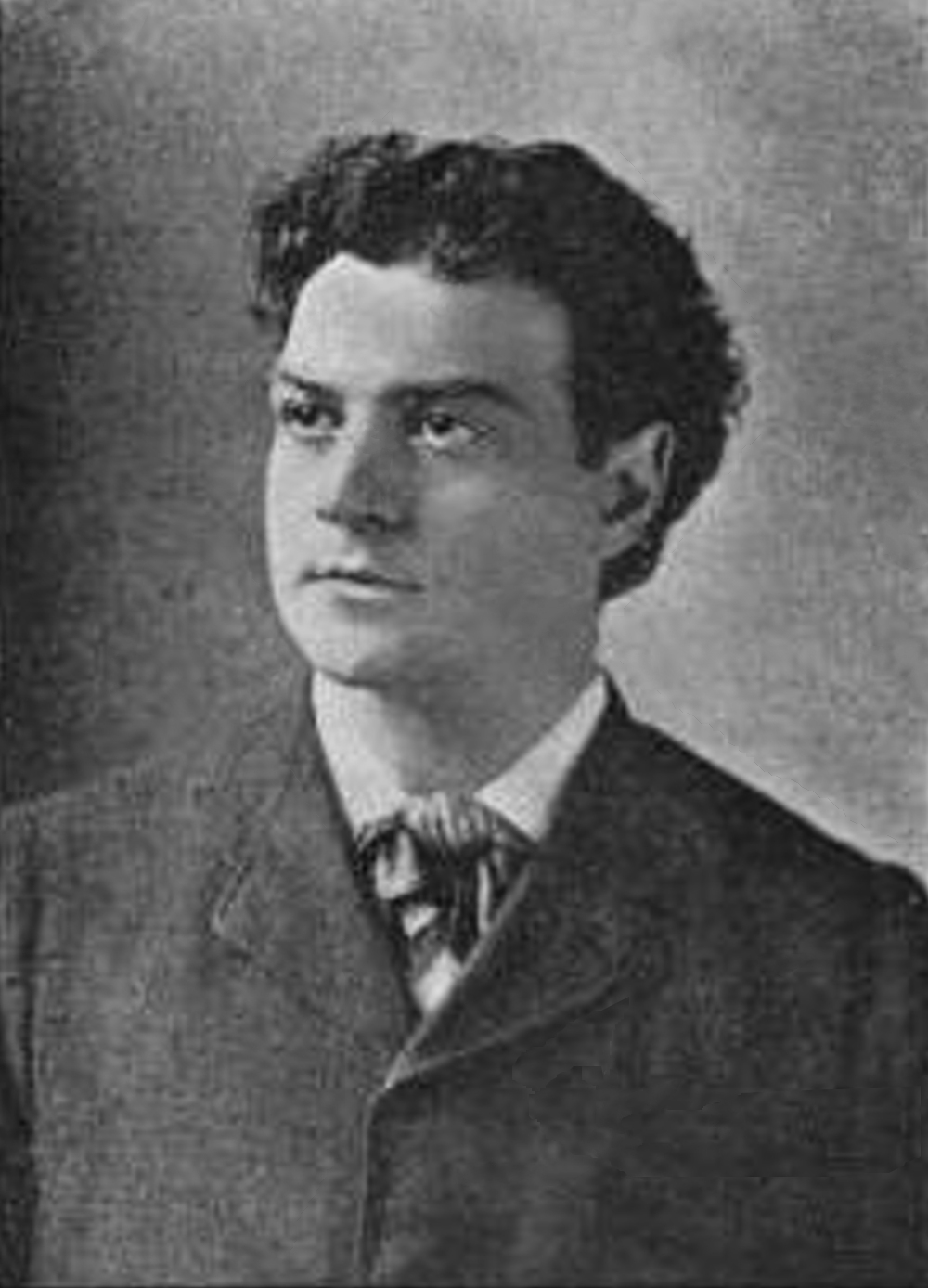
Maud Dixon Salvini's husband, Alexander Salvini, photographed by Sarony

The Salvinis had a series of productions planned together when he died in December 1896, while the couple were in Florence. She announced her intention to return to the stage in 1900. In 1901 she opened a costume studio on West 56th Street, serving the theatre business. In 1911 and 1912 she appeared in The Garden of Allah on Broadway, sharing the stage with stars Mary Mannering and Lewis Waller. In 1916 she was in the cast of Macbeth on Broadway, with Viola Allen playing Lady Macbeth and James K. Hackett in the title role.

=== Writing ===
Salvini and her husband wrote at least two plays together, Cirillo, or, a Child of Naples, and The Council of the Ten. She wrote another play, A Miracle of Love, and maintained the copyrights on several plays and translations by her late husband.

== Personal life ==
Dixon married Tommaso Salvini's actor son, Alexander Salvini, in 1893. He died in 1896. She died in 1944, in her eighties, in New York City. Her grave is in the Actors' Fund plot at Kensico Cemetery in Westchester County.
