= Tommaso Salvini =

Italian actor (1829–1915)

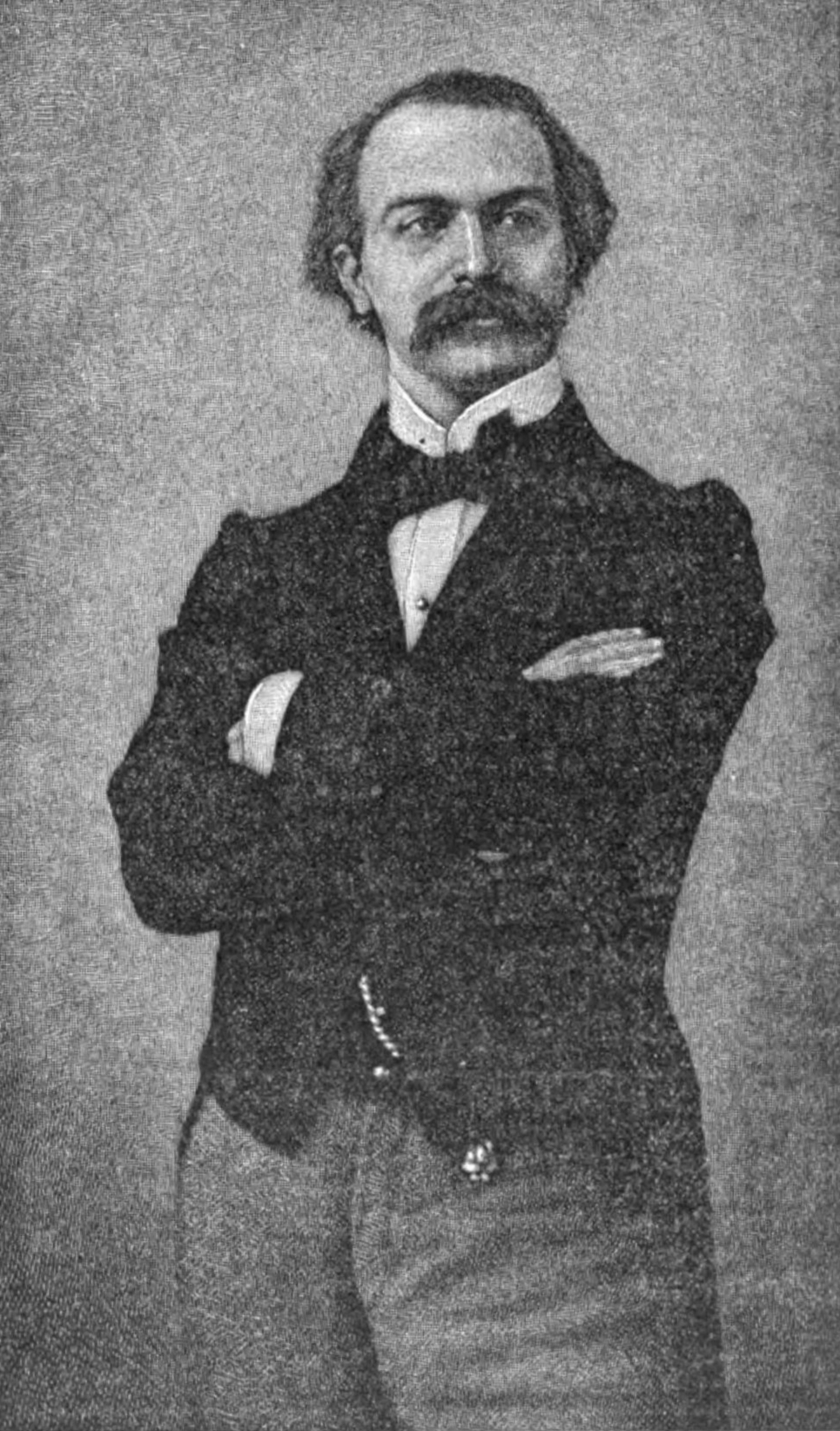
- Salvini in 1892
- Born: 1 January 1829; Milan, Italy
- Died: 31 December 1915 (aged 86); Florence, Italy
- Relatives: Alexander Salvini (son); Sandro Salvini (grandson); Guido Salvini (grandson)| Maud Dixon Salvini (daughter-in-law)

Tommaso Salvini (1 January 1829 – 31 December 1915) was an Italian actor.

== Life ==
Salvini was born in Milan to parents who were both actors, his mother being the popular actress Guglielmina Zocchi. Finding the boy had a talent for acting, his father organised tuition for him under Gustavo Modena, who took a liking to the boy. His father was involved in the Bon and Berlaffa Company who were presenting Goldoni's Donne Curiose, and the actor who was to play the harlequin Pasquino fell ill. Instead of closing the theatre for the night, his father asked the young Salvini to play the role. In his autobiography, he writes that "when I perceived that some of Pasquino's lines were amusing the audience, I took courage, and, like a little bird making his first flight, I arrived at the goal, and was eager to try again … It is certain that from that time I began to feel that I was somebody."

In 1847 Salvini joined the company of Adelaide Ristori, who was then at the beginning of her career. It was with her as Elettra that he won his first success in tragedy, playing the title role in Alfieri's Oreste at the Teatro Valle in Rome.

Salvini fought in the First Italian War of Independence in 1849, but otherwise devoted his life to acting. In 1853, however, he took a year off because "he rarely felt adequately prepared for a role". During this time, he prepared roles in great depth.

1865 was the 600th anniversary of Dante's birth, and as part of the celebrations Florence invited four of Italy's greatest actors—Ristori, Rossi, Salvini and Majeroni—to play in Silvio Pellico's Francesca di Rimini, which is based on an incident in La Divina Commedia. Rossi, who was to play the part of Lancelotto, felt himself ill-suited to the smaller part, and Salvini, who had the grand role of Paolo, graciously exchanged with him, and made a memorable performance of it. Grateful for his display of urbanity, the government of Florence presented Salvini with a statuette of Dante.

Salvini's most famous role was Othello, which he played for the first time at Vicenza in June 1856. His other important roles included Conrad in Paolo Giacometti's La Morte civile, Egisto in Alfieri's Merope, Saul in Alfieri's Saul, Paolo in Silvio Pellico's Francesca da Rimini, Oedipus in Niccolini's play of that name, Macbeth and King Lear. The core of his acting method came from his studies. While visiting Gibraltar, for example, he spent time studying the Moors and found one particular man whom he based his Othello on. Instead of relying on a moustache, which was the traditional way of depicting a Moor, he tried to copy "gestures, movements, and carriage" to depict the character.

Salvini acted frequently in England, and made five visits to the United States, his first in 1873 and his last in 1889. In 1886, he played Othello to the Iago of Edwin Booth. He always delivered his lines in Italian while the rest of the company spoke English (except during his first tour, when he had an Italian company). According to the New York World (27 October 1885), "had he spoke Greek or Chocaw, it would have been much the same. There was that about him that was universal, and had he remained mute and contented himself with acting alone his audience could scarcely have failed to understand, so faithful was his portraiture of human instincts and their action"

Salvini's acting in Othello greatly inspired the young Russian actor Constantin Stanislavski, who saw Salvini perform in Moscow in 1882 and who would, himself, go on to become one of the most important theatre practitioners in the history of theatre. Stanislavski wrote that Salvini was the "finest representative" of his own approach to acting.

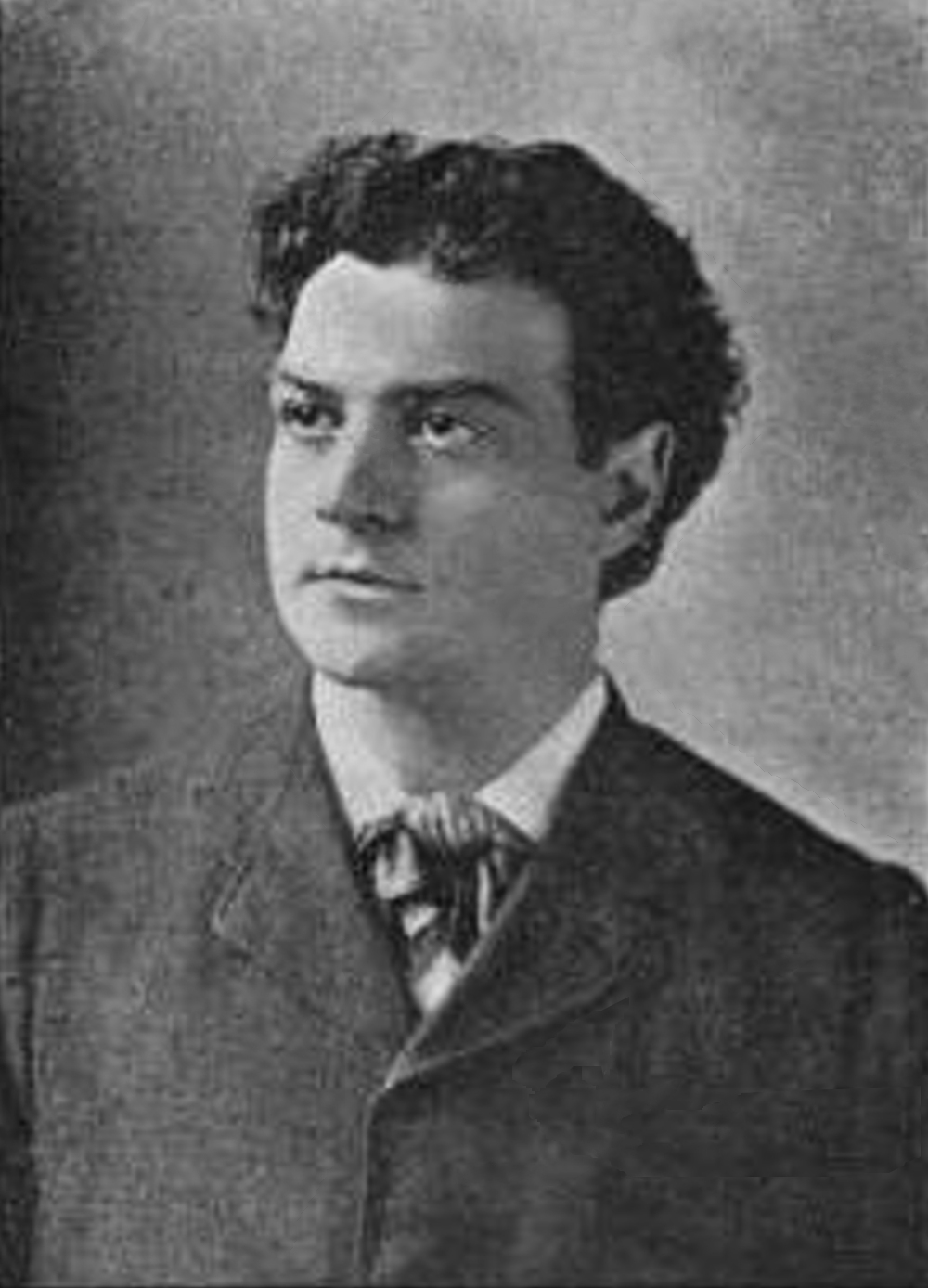
Alexander Salvini (1861–1896), son of Tommaso Salvini

Salvini retired from the stage in 1890, but in January 1902 took part in the celebration in Rome of Ristori's eightieth birthday. Salvini published a volume entitled Ricordi, aneddoti ed impressioni (Milan, 1895). Some idea of his career may be gathered from Leaves from the Autobiography of Tommaso Salvini (London, 1893). He died, aged 86, in Florence.

Salvini was so confident in his talents as an actor that he was once quoted as saying, "I can make an audience weep by reading them a menu."

Salvini made at least one recording for Zonofono in 1902 of "Il sogno" from Saul, which is listed in a recently found contemporary Zonofono celebrity catalogue.

His son Alessandro (aka Alexander Salvini) (1861–1896), also an actor, had several notable successes in America, particularly as d'Artagnan in The Three Musketeers. Another son, Gustavo Salvini, was a stage actor. Gustavo's sons, Tommaso's grandsons, were Alessandro Salvini (1890–1955) and Guido Salvini (1893–1965). Alessandro acted in movies dating back to silent pictures and Guido directed and wrote for films in the sound era.

== Sources ==
- Benedetti, Jean. 1999. Stanislavski: His Life and Art. Revised edition. Original edition published in 1988. London: Methuen. ISBN 0-413-52520-1.
- Carlson, Marvin. The Italian Shakespearians. Washington: The Folger Shakespeare Library. 1985. Print.
- Cole, Tony, and Helen Crich Chinoy. Actors on Acting. New York: Crown Publishers. 1949. Print.
- Iles, George, ed. 19th Century Actor Autobiographies – Tommaso Salvini. n.d. Web. 29 January 2013.
- James, Henry. The Scenic Art. New Brunswick: Rutgers University Press. 1948. Print.
- Stanislavski, Constantin. 1938. An Actor's Work: A Student's Diary. Trans. and ed. Jean Benedetti. London: Routledge, 2008. ISBN 978-0-415-42223-9.
- Woods, Leigh. On Playing Shakespeare. New York: Greenwood Press. 1924. Print.
