= Hobey Baker =

American athlete (1892–1918)

- Hockey Hall of Fame, 1945
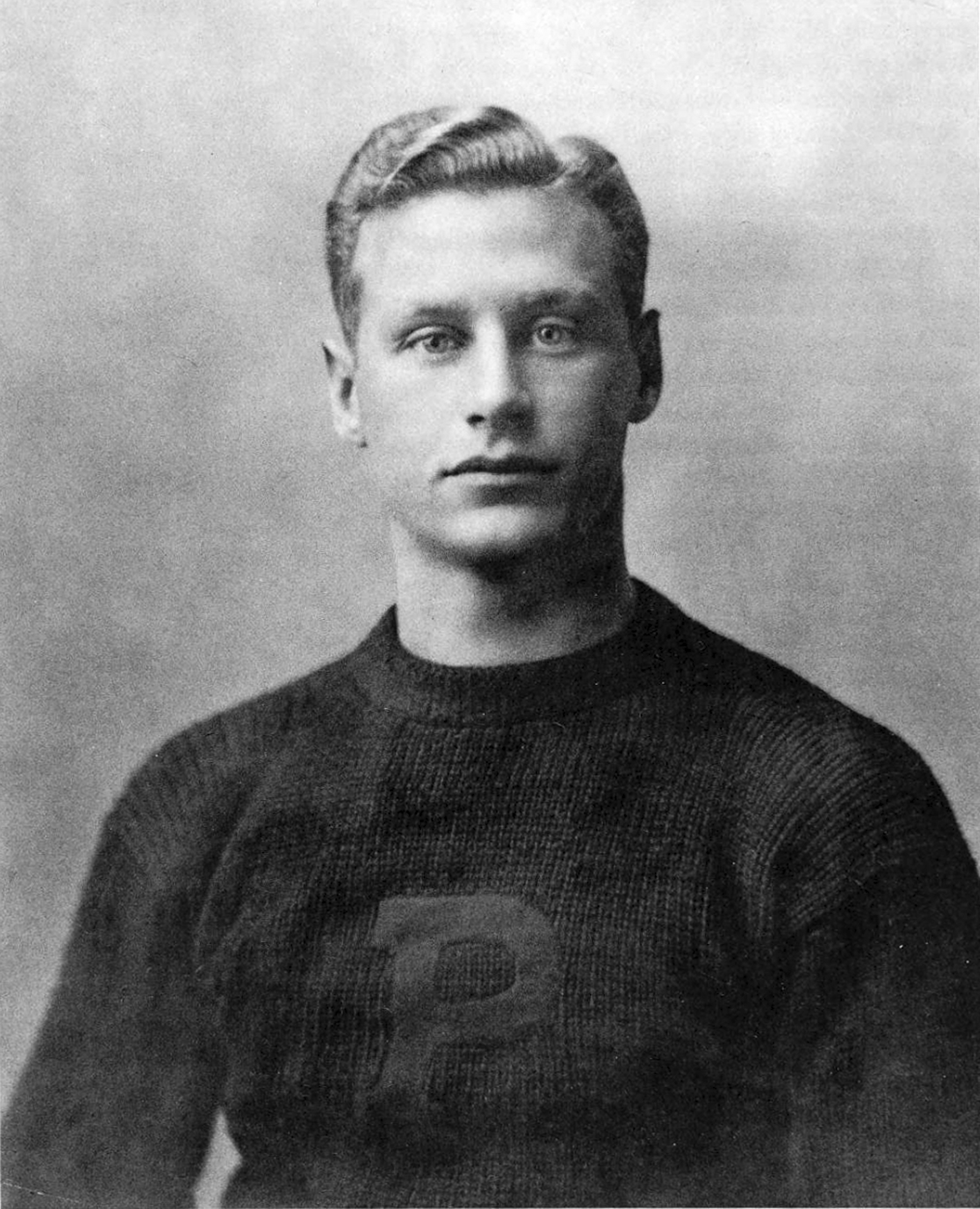
- Born: January 15, 1892 Bala Cynwyd, Pennsylvania, U.S.
- Died: December 21, 1918 (aged 26) Toul, France
- Height: 5 ft 9 in (175 cm)
- Weight: 161 lb (73 kg; 11 st 7 lb)
- Position: Winger / Rover
- Shot: Right
- Played for: St. Paul's School; Princeton Tigers; St. Nicholas Hockey Club
- Playing career: 1906–1916
- Education: Princeton University
- Occupations: Ice hockey player (Rover/Right wing) for the Princeton Tigers and the St. Nicholas Hockey Club; Football player (Quarterback) for the Princeton Tigers; Captain, U.S. Army Air Service
- Years active: 1906–16 (sport); 1917–18 (military)
- Awards: Croix de Guerre (1918); United States Hockey Hall of Fame (1973); College Football Hall of Fame (1975)

Hobart Amory Hare "Hobey" Baker (January 15, 1892 – December 21, 1918) was an American amateur athlete of the early twentieth century. Considered the first American star in ice hockey by the Hockey Hall of Fame, he was also an accomplished American football player. Born into a prominent family from the Philadelphia area, he enrolled at Princeton University in 1910. Baker excelled on the university's hockey and football teams, and became a noted amateur hockey player for the St. Nicholas Hockey Club in New York City. He was a member of three national championship teams, for football in 1911 and hockey in 1912 and 1914, and helped the St. Nicholas Club win a national amateur championship in 1915. Baker graduated from Princeton in 1914 and worked for J.P. Morgan Bank until he enlisted in the United States Army Air Service. During World War I he served with the 103rd and the 13th Aero Squadrons before being promoted to captain and named commander of the 141st Aero Squadron. Baker died in December 1918 after a plane he was test-piloting crashed, hours before he was due to leave France and return to America.

Baker was widely regarded by his contemporaries as one of the best athletes of his time and is considered one of the best early American hockey players. When the Hockey Hall of Fame was founded in 1945, Baker was named one of the first nine inductees, the only American among them. In 1973, he became one of the initial inductees in the United States Hockey Hall of Fame. He was also inducted into the College Football Hall of Fame in 1975, and is the only person in both the hockey and the college football halls of fame.

F. Scott Fitzgerald idolized Baker and based Allenby, a minor character in the 1920 novel This Side of Paradise, on him. In 1921, Princeton named its new hockey arena the Hobey Baker Memorial Rink. The Hobey Baker Award was introduced in 1980, awarded annually to the best collegiate hockey player.

== Early life ==
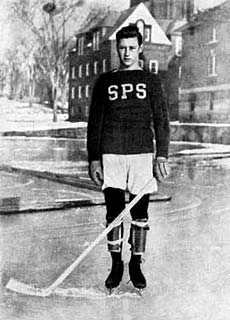
Baker while a student at St. Paul's School

Baker was born in Bala Cynwyd, Pennsylvania, the second son of Alfred Thornton Baker, a wealthy upholsterer, and Mary Augusta Pemberton, a socialite. Alfred, known as Bobby to his friends, had played halfback while a student at Princeton University in the 1880s, the same school his father had attended. One of Baker's ancestors was Francis Rawle, a Quaker who emigrated to Philadelphia in 1688 and became one of the wealthiest members of the city. Baker was named after his uncle, Dr. Hobart Amory Hare, who was the obstetrician at his birth and president of the Jefferson Medical Hospital in Philadelphia. At the age of eleven, Baker and his twelve-year-old brother Thornton were sent to St. Paul's School in Concord, New Hampshire. Baker's parents divorced in 1907 and both remarried.

While at St. Paul's, Baker was introduced to ice hockey. Malcolm Gordon, one of the first people to help develop hockey in the United States, was the coach of the school team and recognized Baker's skill. Baker was known by his classmates to be an exceptionally fast and agile skater. He spent nights skating on frozen ponds to improve his ability to move with the puck while not looking down. Baker was named to the school's varsity team at the age of fourteen and helped St. Paul's defeat some of the best prep schools and universities in the United States. In every sport he attempted, Baker soon demonstrated proficiency. His cousin said that Baker swam through water "like some sort of engine". After his first attempt at golf he was able to score in the low 40s on the school's nine-hole course; after using roller skates for the first time, he was able to perform one-legged stunts within minutes. He once entered St. Paul's annual cross-country race for fun and won, defeating some of the school's most proficient runners. At the age of fifteen he was named the school's best athlete for his skill in hockey, football, baseball, tennis, swimming, and track. Most of his former classmates recalled their time at St. Paul's with Baker solely by his athletic achievements.

Alfred Baker lost much of his savings in the Panic of 1907 and could only afford to send one of his sons to college. Thornton agreed to let his talented younger brother continue his education, a sacrifice that Hobey Baker never forgot. Although an above-average student, Baker stayed an extra year at St. Paul's in 1909 to allow his father another year to save money. By the time Baker left St. Paul's, his sporting achievements had helped make him one of the school's most popular students.

== Princeton ==
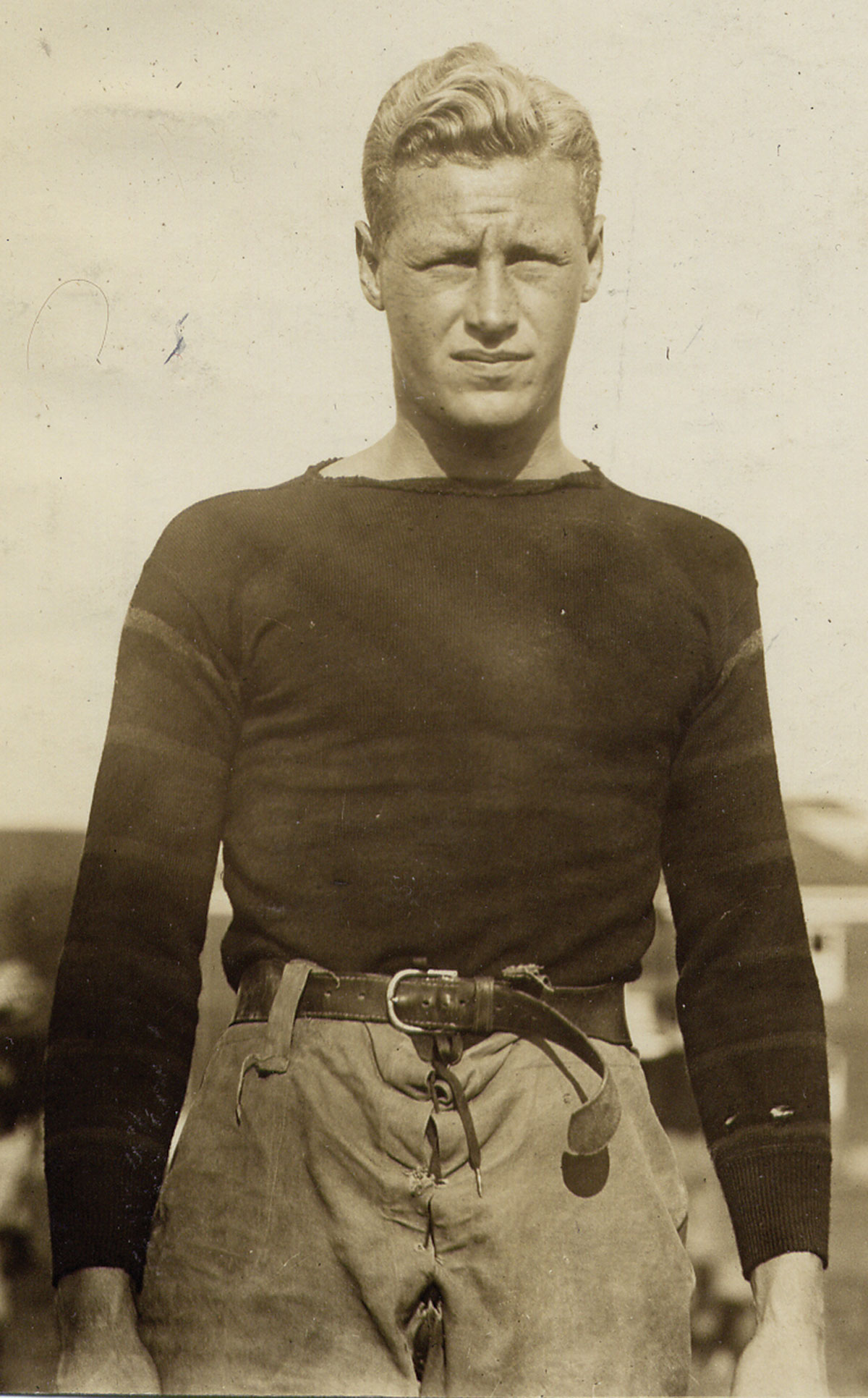
Baker while a member of the Princeton football team

In 1910, Baker enrolled at Princeton University as a member of the Class of 1914. Along with six other classmates from St. Paul's, he lived in a house at 82 Nassau Street in Princeton. He joined the school's hockey, football, and baseball teams in his freshman year. The university's rules stated that students could only play two varsity sports, so Baker played outfield for the freshman baseball team before he gave up that sport to focus on hockey and football. In one of his first games with the football team, he helped defeat rival Yale when he faked a drop-kick field goal and instead ran the ball for a touchdown. Easily recognizable on the field because he wore no helmet, Baker was referred to as "the blond Adonis of the gridiron" by Philadelphia sportswriters. Princeton finished the 1911 season with a record of eight wins and two ties in ten games and won the national championship. During a game against Yale on November 18, 1911, Baker set a school record that still stands when he had 13 punt returns for 63 yards.

During the 1911 football season Baker scored 92 points, a school record that lasted until 1974. Princeton finished the 1912 season with seven wins, one loss, and one tie in nine games. As the Princeton hockey team did not have its own ice rink, most of their home games were played in New York City at the St. Nicholas Rink, one of the few facilities in the world with artificial ice at the time. The team finished the 1911–12 hockey season with a record of eight wins and two losses in ten games. During his sophomore year, Baker was invited to join the Ivy Club, the oldest and most prestigious of the eating clubs that were at the center of social life at the university.

Baker was named captain of the football team in 1913, his senior year. Princeton finished with a record of five wins, two losses, and one tie. Over his three-year football career with the Tigers, Baker scored 180 points, a school record that lasted until 1964 when Cosmo Iacavazzi broke it in the final quarter of his last college game. Baker caught over 900 punts in his career, and averaged 300 yards in punt returns per season. He was awarded a varsity letter in football five times; combined with the three letters he earned in hockey, his total was the most that could be earned at Princeton at the time.

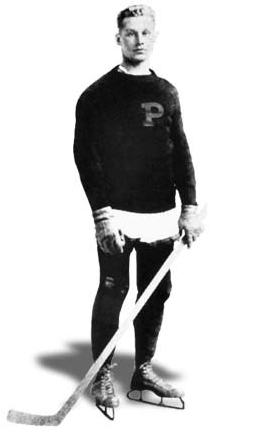
Baker as a member of the Princeton hockey team

It was during the 1913–14 hockey season, Baker's senior year, that his most famous game with Princeton took place. On January 24, they played Harvard at the Boston Arena. Initially the favorite to win, Princeton had a setback as one of its star players was injured and unable to play, and another was suspended. Baker was repeatedly called offside, as he was too fast for the two replacement Princeton players (players were required to stay behind the puck-carrier at the time). In the "sudden death" overtime, after sixty minutes of play, Baker was not even breathing heavily. The game was the longest college hockey game played up to that point.

The final hockey game of Baker's Princeton career was at Ottawa's Dey's Arena against the University of Ottawa on February 28, 1914, for the Intercollegiate Hockey Championship of America. Ottawa defeated Princeton by a 3–2 score. Princeton won the 1914 national championship after they finished with a record of ten wins and three losses. Statistics were not kept of his time at Princeton, but biographer Emil Salvini estimated Baker to have scored over 120 goals and 100 assists in three years, an average of three goals and three assists per game. As well as skill, Baker was known for his sportsmanship. In a hockey game against Harvard on January 22, 1913, Baker recorded the only penalty of his collegiate career, for slashing; Princeton lost the game 5–4 in overtime. He visited the dressing rooms of opponents after every game to shake hands with each player.

In early 1914, Baker graduated from Princeton, majoring in history, politics, and economics, and finished with above-average grades. He was named the school's best football player, hockey player, and all-round athlete and the man who had done the most for Princeton. The football team had posted a record of twenty wins, three losses, and four ties in Baker's three seasons as a member; the hockey team fared equally well with a record of twenty wins and seven losses. By the end of his football career at Princeton, he had two notable achievements: he had never fumbled a punt, and had never lost to Yale.

== Post-university years ==
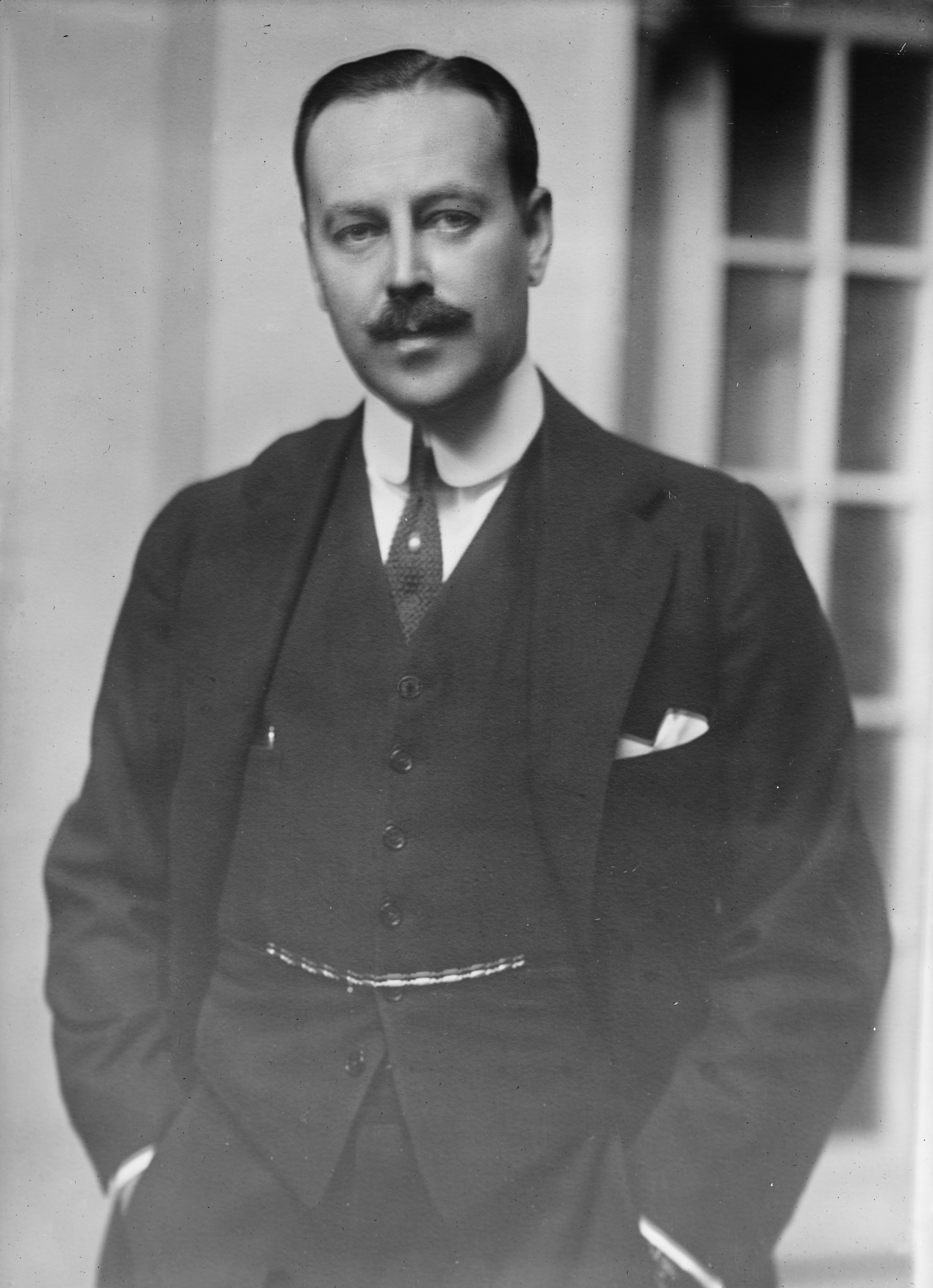
Percy Rivington Pyne 2nd, Baker's close friend.

The summer after graduation, Baker toured Europe as a celebrity correspondent for The New York Times, where he wrote about events like the Henley Royal Regatta. Through his Princeton classmates, he was hired by Wall Street insurance firm Johnson & Higgins upon his return to the United States. Soon after, another Princeton graduate offered him a job at J.P. Morgan Bank. Hired onto a two-year trainee program, Baker earned about $20 per week. Baker befriended a rich New York socialite, Percy R. Pyne 2nd, who had also attended St. Paul's and Princeton. Though ten years older than Baker, they quickly became friends and Pyne invited Baker to live with him at his house at 263 Madison Avenue, which he did for two years. Pyne was known to be gay, and there is evidence suggestive of a romantic relationship. In 1917, Baker wrote to Pyne: "I can’t tell you what your letters mean to me...the picture of you came, also...When I feel especially dirty, I shall look at that picture...it makes me want to see you so much....I get horrible homesick and get thinking of the wonderful times we had when we weren’t scrapping."

Pyne later introduced Baker to Jeanne Marie Scott, an equally rich socialite known as Mimi, to whom Baker was briefly engaged late in 1918. A quiet individual, Baker was embarrassed when bank executives brought important clients by his office to see him. He quickly tired of working in an office job, and looked for ways to alleviate his boredom.

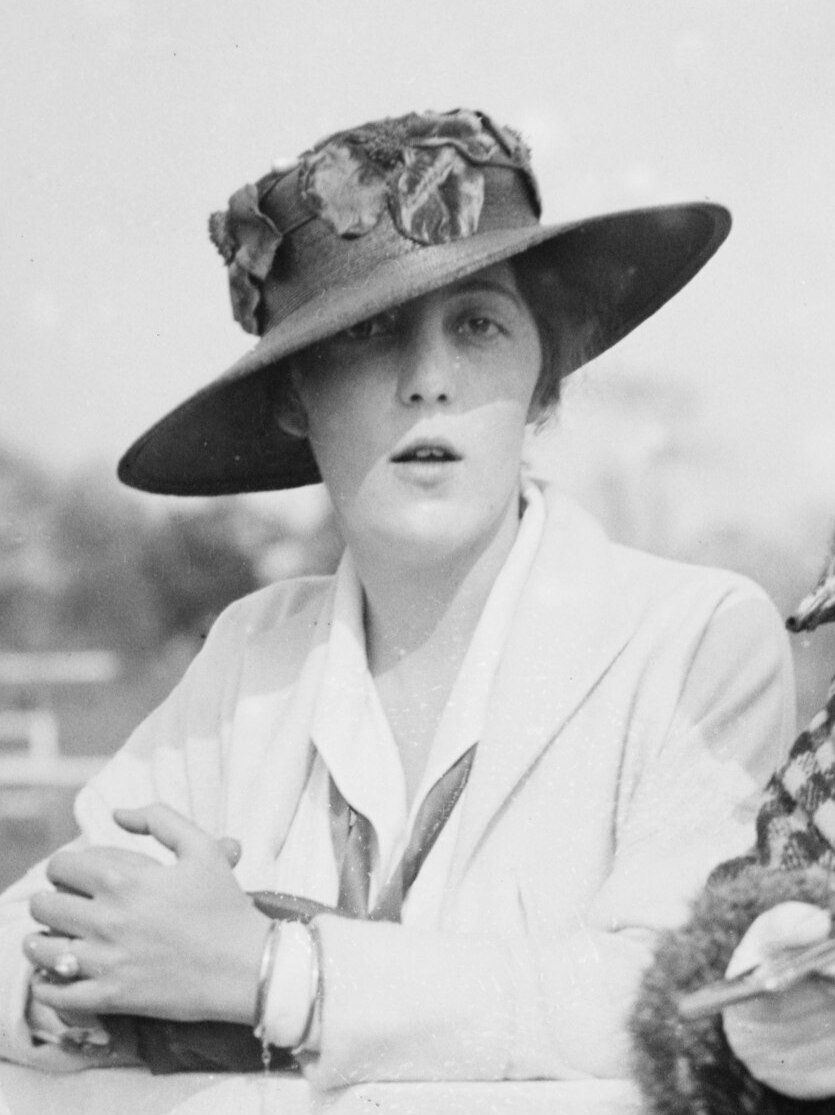
Jeanne Marie "Mimi" Scott, Baker's onetime fiancée

Baker found enjoyment outside the office through sports. He joined the St. Nicholas Club, an amateur hockey team in New York, soon after he arrived in the city. Pyne introduced Baker to both polo and auto racing, sports he quickly mastered. Baker remained well known from his time at Princeton; marquees at his home arena, which was shared with Princeton, often said "Hobey Baker Plays Tonight". This made Baker uncomfortable and he eventually asked the building manager to take down the sign. Preferring a life out of the public eye, he once told a reporter that he would rather have nothing written about him. In order to leave the arena quickly after hockey games without having to deal with the public, Baker often borrowed Pyne's valet and car. During the two years that Baker played hockey with St. Nicholas, he was recognized as one of the best players in the American Amateur Hockey League and named to the post-season All-Star Teams both years. While still with the St. Nicholas Club, Baker was offered a contract by the Montreal Canadiens of the National Hockey Association. He turned down an offer of $20,000 to play three seasons as social conventions prohibited a person of his standing from playing sports for money.

On March 24, 1917, Baker played his last hockey game at the Winter Garden at Exposition Hall in Pittsburgh. The game pitted an amateur all-star team from Philadelphia, led by Baker, against an all-star team from Pittsburgh's amateur leagues. The Philadelphia team defeated Pittsburgh in overtime by a score of 3–2. Baker scored all three Philadelphia goals to net a hat trick. Baker began to tire of playing hockey after 1915; the constant physical play of opposing players on the ice had taken its toll, and the growing professionalism of the sport went against his belief that sports should be played for the love of the game.

=== World War I ===
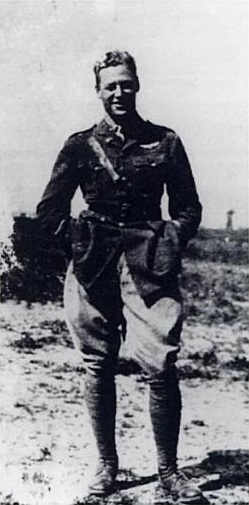
Baker as a fighter pilot in World War I. He had three confirmed kills during the war.

Looking for new adventures, in 1916 he joined a civilian aviation corps led by New York City attorney Phillip A. Carroll on Governors Island, off the coast of Manhattan, a privately funded program to train civilians to pass the Reserve Military Aviator flying test and receive commissions in the Signal Officers Reserve Corps. He often went to the island late in the afternoon after he finished work for the day. Baker found the same enjoyment in flying that he had in sports, but with a more serious aspect. Prior to the annual Yale–Princeton football game on November 18, 1916, Baker in a Curtiss "Jenny" flown by fellow Governors Island student Cord Meyer (a Yalie), joined a squadron of New York National Guard Jennies led by Captain Raynal Bolling, the most to have ever flown in military formation, and flew to Palmer Stadium, home of the Princeton football team. The planes performed several maneuvers, to the delight of the crowd, and Baker landed on the field, becoming the first person to reach a football game by air.

The entry of the United States into World War I excited Baker, as it finally gave him a purpose in life and allowed him to make good use of his pilot training. He left the United States for Europe in the summer of 1917, among the first group of Americans to do so. Though eager to join the front immediately, Baker was told that he had to be certified by the French. Success in the courses was dependent on how quickly the pilots learned French, the predominant language of instruction. Though he managed to complete all the courses easily, a lack of qualified teachers meant that Baker was first sent to a school in England for more training and then back to France to teach Americans what he had learned in England, in an attempt to create pilots as quickly as possible. This discouraged Baker, who was eager to get into the front lines and fight. Owing to a lack of aircraft supplies, Baker was stuck in Paris, and doubted he would ever get to the front. While in Paris, he was happy to continue seeing Scott, who had enlisted as a nurse and worked at a hospital in France.

Baker was finally sent to the front in April and assigned to the 103d Aero Squadron, formed from former members of the Lafayette Escadrille and Lafayette Flying Corps in January 1918. Baker helped to bring down an enemy plane for the first time in his career on May 21, but due to a complicated system of confirming kills, he was not given credit for it. In a letter home describing the battle, Baker said it was the "biggest thrill I ever had in my life", and compared it to the feeling after a big sports game. Throughout the spring of 1918 Baker continued to lead planes over the front, and continued to see Scott, although he began to have reservations over their future together due to the financial disparity between them. After his first confirmed kill on May 21, 1918, the French government awarded him the Croix de Guerre.

During the summer, Baker was transferred to the 13th Aero Squadron after its commander, Captain Charles Biddle, requested that he join the squadron as a flight commander. Though reluctant to leave the 103rd, Baker felt that Biddle would not have requested him without confidence in his abilities. On July 20, the 13th Squadron recorded its first confirmed kill during a flight led by Baker; he and two other men shot down a German plane. In August, Baker and another pilot were promoted and given command of their own squadron; Baker was given charge of the 141st Aero Squadron, composed of 26 pilots and 180 enlisted men stationed behind the front line, where they had to wait for equipment to arrive before leaving for the front.

Various delays in the arrival of planes and equipment meant that Baker's squadron was unable to participate in the final major offensives of the war. In September, Baker became engaged to Scott. He asked Pyne to sell a bond to pay for an engagement ring, and the newspapers in the United States carried headlines that announced the engagement. Early in October, Baker was promoted again and given the rank of captain. The planes and equipment arrived for his squadron soon after. Baker had the planes painted in Princeton's black and orange and adopted a tiger for the squadron insignia. He recorded two more kills on October 28 and November 5, the last of his career (despite reports at the time of his death, Baker was not an ace, as that required five confirmed kills).

Around the time of the armistice which ended the war, Baker's engagement with Scott was broken off; Scott then began a relationship with an American diplomat in Paris, Philander Cable. Missing his fiancée and the excitement of the war, he felt directionless; he dreaded going back to work in an office and considered himself a sportsman rather than a businessman. Though he was scheduled to return to the United States in December, Baker requested and was refused an extension of his time in France.

== Death ==
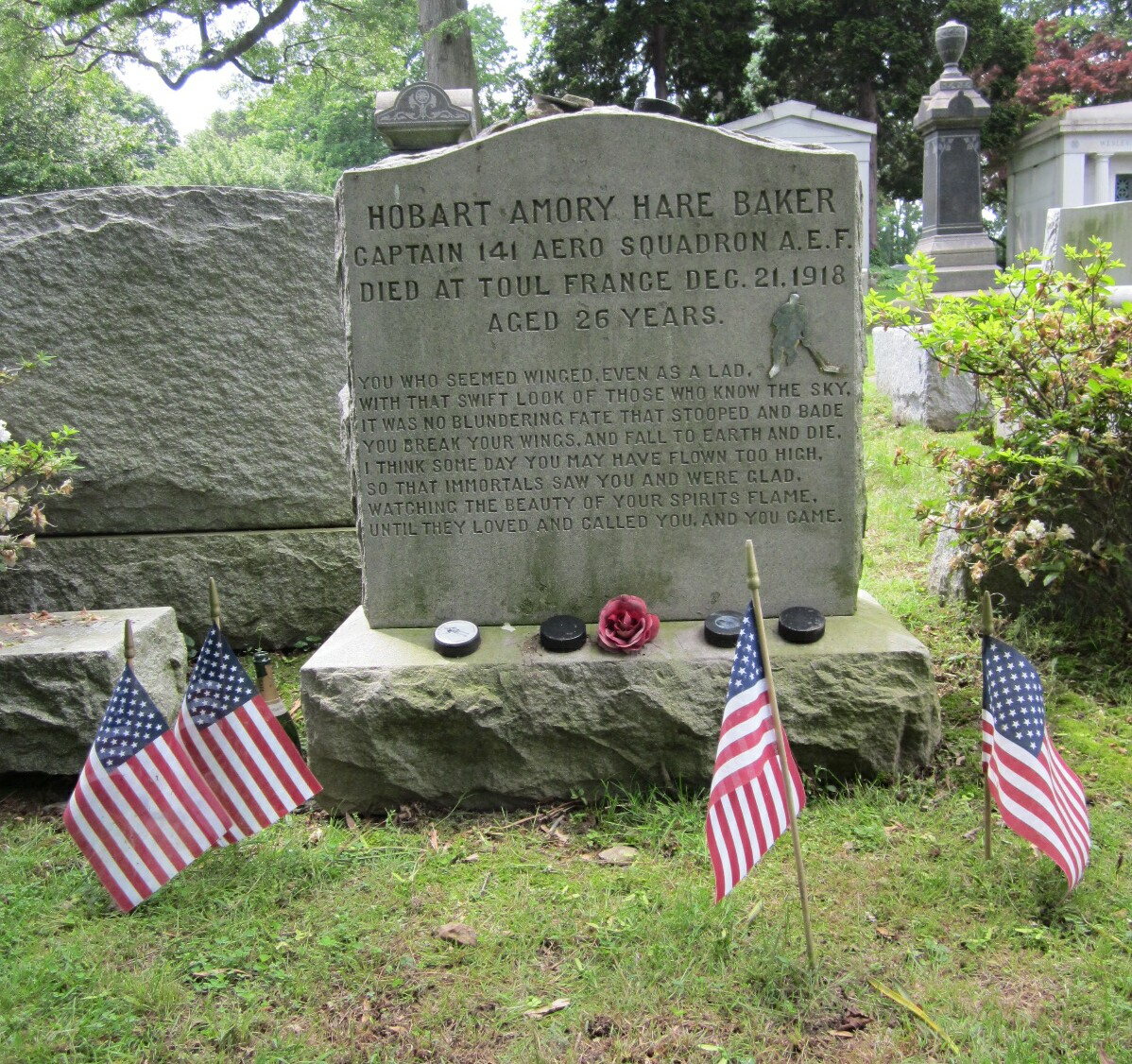
Baker's grave in West Laurel Hill Cemetery

On December 21, 1918, Baker received orders to return to the United States. Reluctant to leave France and return to his life in America, he decided to take a final flight at his squadron's airfield in Toul. As he went for his own plane, the mechanic brought out a recently repaired one instead, in need of a test flight. The other pilots remonstrated with Baker, but he maintained that as commanding officer he could not let anyone else test the aircraft.

In heavy rain, Baker took off and began to level off at 600 feet. A quarter of a mile into the flight, the engine failed. The plane was generally easy to crash-land if necessary, something he had done previously at the cost of a few broken ribs.

Instead of running straight away to land he started to turn back toward the field. The wing slipped, the machine crashed and he was killed.

— Eyewitness account of Baker's death by Cpt. Edwin H. Cooper, 26th Division Photographic Officer, United States Signal Corps

A few hundred yards from the airfield, his plane crashed nose first into the ground. He was quickly freed from the aircraft by his men, but died in an ambulance minutes later; his orders to return home were found in his jacket pocket. Baker was buried in a small military cemetery near Toul; in 1921, his mother had his remains moved to her family plot in West Laurel Hill Cemetery, Bala Cynwyd, Pennsylvania.

Though newspapers reported that Baker had died as a result of engine failure, unsubstantiated rumors began to circulate that his death was not accidental. Those who knew him were aware of his reluctance to return to civilian life and his feelings over the loss of Scott. He could have returned to America and played professional sport, where he could have earned far more money than from a job in finance, but his upbringing made that impossible for him. A career in business held no appeal; during a weekend vacation with a fellow Princeton graduate, Baker revealed that he felt his life was over, and he would never again experience the thrills of football or hockey. In 1966, author John D. Davies published a biography of Baker, in which he noted that a relative of Baker's could not see a future for him in the post-war world. However, Davies refused to elaborate on what he called the "suicide theory of [Baker's] enigmatic death", as he feared that "some of the old guard would be furious if they thought I was trying to prove it".

== Legacy ==
You who seemed winged, even as a lad,
With that swift look of those who know the sky,
It was no blundering fate that stooped and bade
You break your wings, and fall to earth and die,
I think some day you may have flown too high,
So that immortals saw you and were glad,
Watching the beauty of your spirits flame,
Until they loved and called you, and you came.

— Inscription on Baker's tombstone.

Baker is considered one of the greatest ice hockey players of his era, and the first great American hockey player. He was one of the first nine players inducted into the Hockey Hall of Fame upon its founding in 1945, the first American so honored, and was inducted into the United States Hockey Hall of Fame as one of its charter members in 1973. Baker was posthumously awarded the Lester Patrick Trophy by the National Hockey League and USA Hockey in 1987 for his contributions to hockey in the United States. In 1975, he was inducted into the College Football Hall of Fame and is the only person in both the College Football and Hockey Halls of Fame. Baker was also inducted into the Philadelphia Sports Hall of Fame in 2010.

His popularity was such that, after he enlisted in the military, so many of his fellow Princeton athletes followed his lead that the school had to cancel its hockey team for the 1917–18 season; all five starting players enlisted in the armed forces. Of the eleven players on the team the previous season, nine enlisted shortly after Baker.

Baker was also the inspiration for literary works. In 1913 F. Scott Fitzgerald enrolled at Princeton as a freshman, when Baker was a senior. Though he only spoke to Baker once during their time at Princeton, Fitzgerald idolized him. His first novel, This Side of Paradise, has several references to Baker: the main character is named Amory Blaine after Baker's middle name, and the minor character Allenby is Baker himself. Mark Goodman's 1985 novel Hurrah for the Next Man Who Dies is a fictionalized account of Baker's life.

Baker's honors included a citation on March 27, 1919, by General John Pershing, commander of the American Expeditionary Forces, for exceptional bravery on May 21, 1918, when he brought down his first plane. The Hobey Baker Award was established in 1981 and is awarded annually to the best player in NCAA hockey. The Hobey Baker Legends of College Hockey Award was also created that year and is given to the "all-time great contributors to the game of college hockey" each year. Since 1950, Princeton has awarded the Hobey Baker Trophy to the "freshman hockey player who, among his classmates, in play, sportsmanship and influence has contributed most to the sport." When Princeton opened their hockey arena in 1921, it was named the Hobey Baker Memorial Rink. At St. Paul's, hockey players compete for an award known as "Hobey's Stick". Inside the bar of the Nassau Inn in Princeton is a photo of Baker flanked by two other famous Princeton athletes, Bill Bradley and Dick Kazmaier. The Ivy Club, of which Baker was a member, has had a painting of him in the living room. In 2024, ESPN's 30 for 30 podcast explored Baker's life, legacy, and possibly queer relationship with Percy R. Pyne II, in "Searching for Hobey Baker" (narrated by David Duchovny).

== Career statistics ==
=== Regular season and playoffs ===
			Regular season					Playoffs
Season	Team	League	GP	G	A	Pts	PIM	GP	G	A	Pts	PIM
1906–07	St. Paul's School	High School	—	—	—	—	—	—	—	—	—	—
1907–08	St. Paul's School	High School	—	—	—	—	—	—	—	—	—	—
1908–09	St. Paul's School	High School	—	—	—	—	—	—	—	—	—	—
1909–10	St. Paul's School	High School	—	—	—	—	—	—	—	—	—	—
1910–11	Princeton Freshman Team	Freshman	—	—	—	—	—	—	—	—	—	—
1911–12	Princeton Tigers	IHA	10	26	15^{‡}	41	0	—	—	—	—	—
1912–13	Princeton Tigers	IHL	14	35	16^{‡}	51	0	—	—	—	—	—
1913–14	Princeton Tigers	IHL	13	19	13^{‡}	32	2	—	—	—	—	—
1914–15	St. Nicholas Hockey Club	AAHL	8	17	0	17	—	—	—	—	—	—
1915–16	St. Nicholas Hockey Club	AAHL	7	9	0	9	—	3	1	0	1	—
College totals			37	80	44	124	2	—	—	—	—	—
AAHL totals			15	26	0	26	—	3	1	0	1	—

Amateur statistics from Total Hockey, Diamond 2002, p. 616
‡ Assists were not officially recorded as a statistic. The numbers here reflect only the assists that were credited to Baker in the game summaries. The actual total is likely higher.

== Awards ==
=== AAHL ===
Award	Year(s)
First All-Star Team	1915, 1916

=== NHL ===
Award	Year(s)
Lester Patrick Trophy	1987

== See also ==
- List of ice hockey players who died during their playing career
