= Salvi =

Salvi may refer to:

== Countries and cultures ==
- El Salvador, or Salvadoran people, especially Salvadoran Americans

== Names ==
=== Given Name ===
- Salvi (footballer) (born 1991), Spanish footballer
- Giovanni Battista Salvi da Sassoferrato (1609–1685), Italian painter
- Salvi Castellucci (1608–1672), Italian painter
- Salvius of Albi (or Sauve; fl. c. 580), bishop of Albi in Francia

=== Surname ===
- Aavishkar Salvi (born 1981), Indian cricketer
- Abhijit Salvi (born 1992), Indian cricketer
- Al Salvi (born 1960), American politician
- Alessandro Salvi (born 1968), Italian footballer
- Antonio Salvi (1664–1724), Italian poet and librettist
- Arnaldo Salvi (1915–2002), Italian professional football player.
- Cesare Salvi (born 1948), Italian politician
- Chris Salvi (born 1989), American football player
- Dada Salvi, (1904–1980), Indian film actor and director
- Dattaji Salvi, leader of Shiv Sena and a trade unionist
- Deepak Salvi, criminal lawyer in the High Court of Bombay
- Enzo Salvi (born Vincenzo Salvi, in 1963), Italian actor
- Eugenia Salvi (born 1960), athlete from Italy competing in compound archery
- Francesco Salvi (born 1953), Italian actor, writer, comedian, singer and architect
- Gian Ercole Salvi, Italian athlete and then a manager of the Virtus Pallacanestro Bologna
- John Salvi (1972–1996), anti-abortion terrorist
- Julian Salvi (born 1985), Australian rugby union player
- Lorenzo Salvi (19th century), Italian opera singer
- Lorenzo Salvi, blessed (1782–1856), Italian Roman Catholic priest and a professed member of the Passionists
- Luis Salvadores Salvi (1932–2014), Chilean basketball player
- Manasi Salvi (born 1980), Indian television and film actress
- Matteo Salvi (1816–1887), Italian composer
- Mirko Salvi (born 1994), Swiss professional footballer
- Nicola Salvi (1697–1751), Italian architect
- Paolo Salvi (1891–1945), Italian gymnast
- Pooja Salvi, Indian film actress and model
- Rajan Salvi, Indian politician two times deputy in the Maharashtra Legislative Assembly from 2009
- Shankarrao Salvi (1931–2007), Indian Kabaddi player, coach and administrator
- Victor Salvi (1920–2015), Italian-American harpist and harp manufacturer

== Others ==
- Salvi (caste), a caste in Rajasthan, India
- Salvi Harps, Italian brand of concert harps

== See also ==
- Salvia (disambiguation)
- Salvini (disambiguation)
- Salvetti, a surname
