= François-Thomas-Marie de Baculard d'Arnaud =

French writer, playwright, poet and novelist

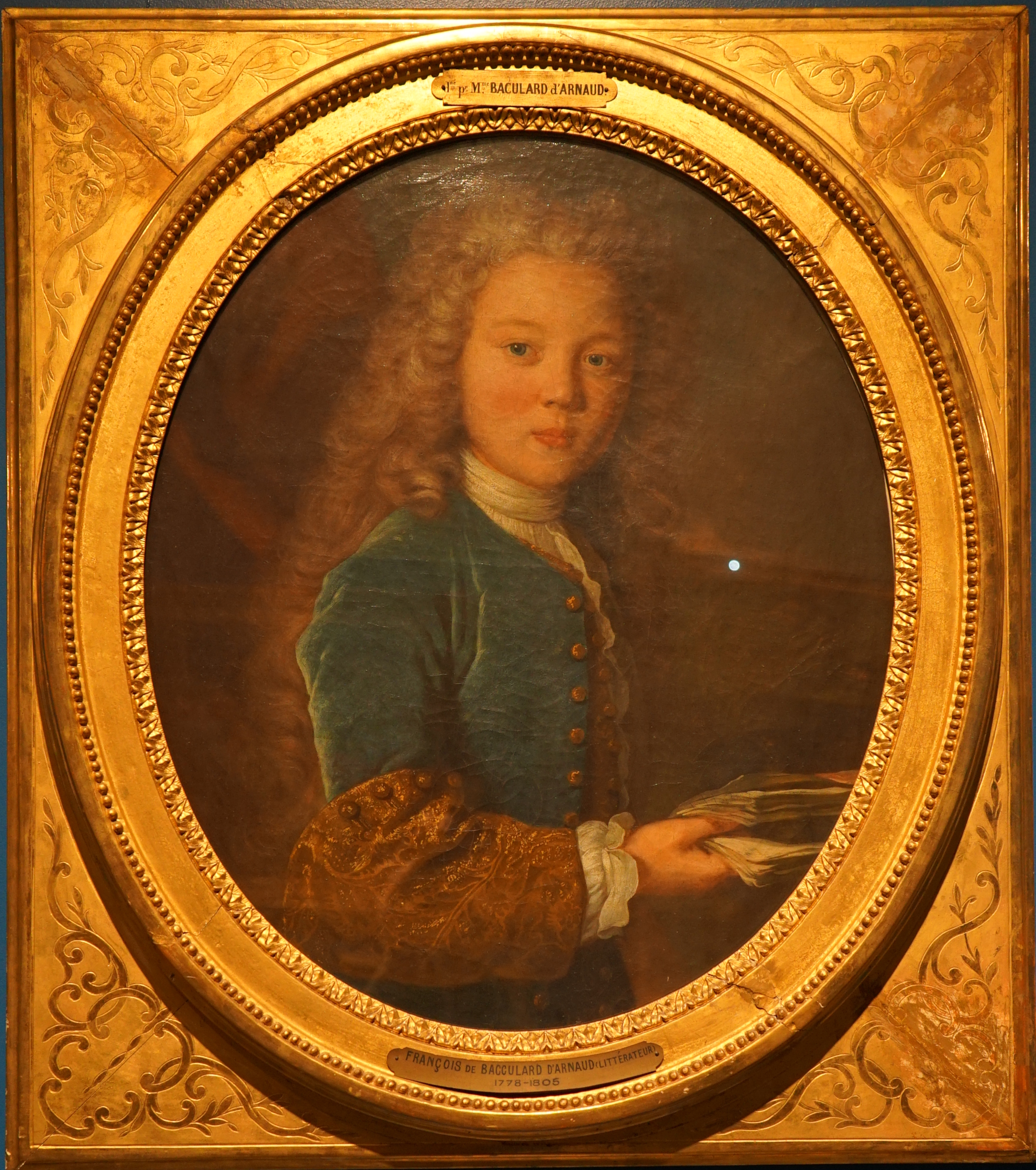
- Born: 15 September 1718; Paris, France
- Died: 6 November 1805 (aged 87); Paris, France
- Other names: Playwright, poet

François-Thomas-Marie de Baculard d'Arnaud (8 September 1718 – 8 November 1805) was a French writer, playwright, poet and novelist. His series of novellas Les Épreuves du sentiment inspired Bellini's opera Adelson e Salvini. His 1740 play Coligny was inspired by Voltaire's Henriade and depicts the St. Bartholomew's Day massacre.

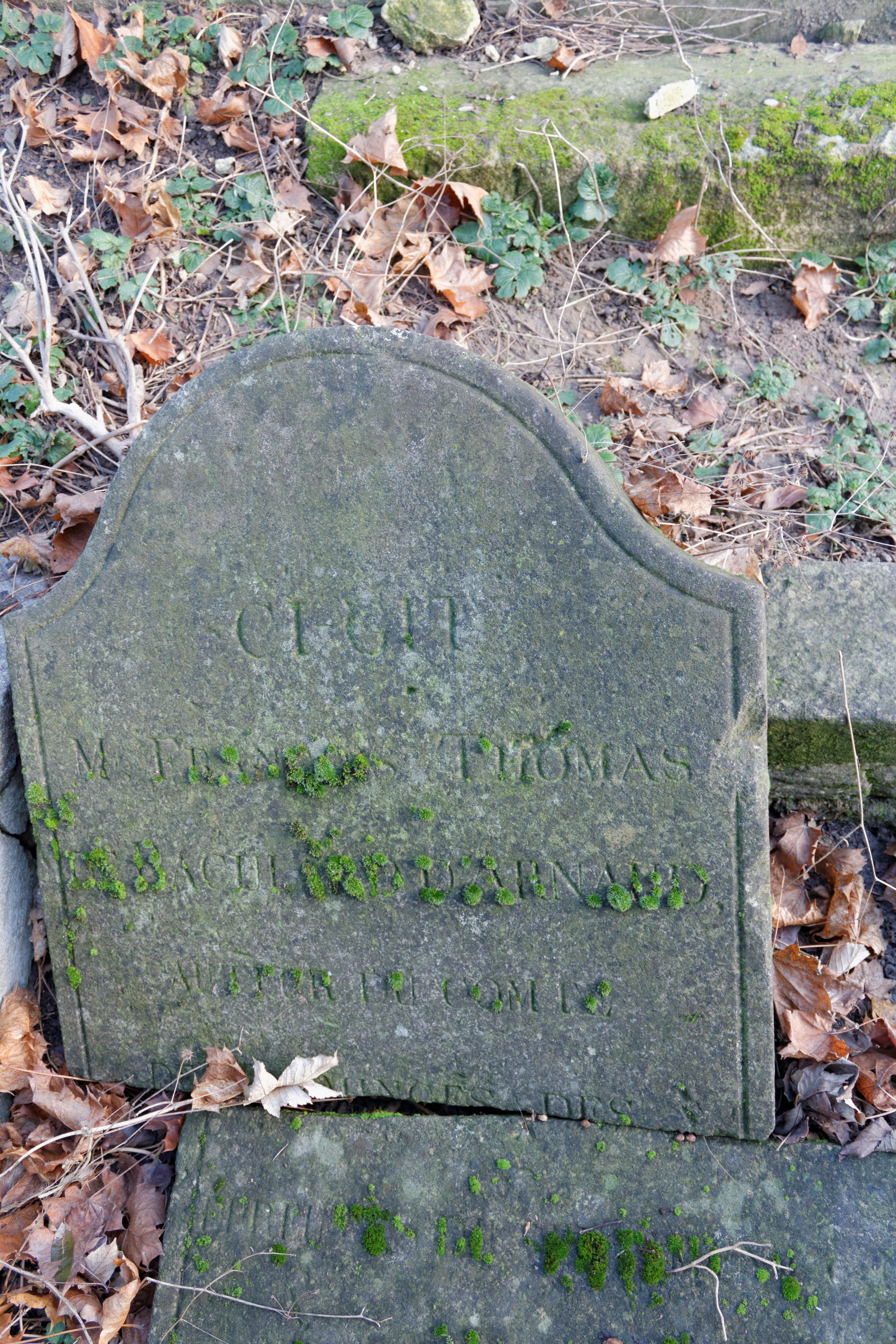
Grave at the Père Lachaise cemetery.

== Works ==
=== Theatre ===
- Coligni, ou la St. Barthelemi, tragédie en trois actes et en vers, 1740
- Le Cardinal de Lorraine ou les Massacres de la Saint Barthélemy, tragédie en trois actes, 1756
- Les Amans malheureux, ou le Comte de Comminge, drame en 3 actes et en vers, adaptation des Mémoires du comte de Comminge de Mme de Tencin, 1764 Text online
- Euphémie, ou le Triomphe de la religion, drame, 1768 Text online
- Fayel, tragédie, représentée sur le Théâtre de la Cour par les Comédiens français ordinaires du Roi, 1770 Text on line
- Mérinval, drame en cinq actes et en vers, 1774 Text online
- Les Fêtes namuroises, ou les Échasses, petite comédie, ornée de chants et de danses, 1775
- Œuvres dramatiques, 2 vol., 1782 Text online 1 2

=== Varia ===
- Ode sur la naissance de S. A. S. Monseigneur le prince de Condé, 1736 Text online
- Lettre à Monsieur l'abbé Phi** [Philippe] au sujet des tragédies de M. de Voltaire, 1736 Text online
- Theresa, histoire italienne, avec un discours sur le roman, 1745-1746
- La Mort du maréchal comte de Saxe, poème, 1750 Text online
- La France sauvée, poème, 1757
- Les Époux malheureux, ou Histoire de Monsieur et Madame de La Bédoyère, écrite par un ami, 1758
- Fanni, ou l'Heureux repentir, histoire anglaise, 1764
- Lucie et Mélanie, ou les Deux sœurs généreuses, anecdote historique, 1767
- Sargines, ou l'Élève de l'amour, nouvelle, 1772 Text online
- Zénothémis, anecdote marseillaise, 1773
- Nouvelles historiques, 3 vol., 1774-1783
  - La Romance du sire de Créqui
- Les Épreuves du sentiment, 5 vol., 1775-1778
- Œuvres complètes, 5 vol., 1775-1777
- Sidnei et Silli, ou la Bienfaisance et la reconnaissance, histoire anglaise, suivie d'odes anacréontiques, 1776 Text online
- Vie de Dérues, exécuté à Paris en place de Grève, le 6 mai 1777, 1777 Text online
- Délassemens de l'homme sensible, ou Anecdotes diverses, 12 vol., 1783-1787 Text online 1-2 3-4 5-6 7-8 9-10 11-12
- La Vraie grandeur, ou Hommage à la bienfaisance de son altesse sérénissime monseigneur le duc d'Orléans, 1789 Text enline
- Les Loisirs utiles. Linville, ou les Plaisirs de la vertu. Eugénie, ou les Suites funestes d'une première faute, 1795
- Les Matinées, nouvelles anecdotes, 1798
- Denneville, ou l'Homme tel qu'il devrait être, 3 vol., 1802
- Œuvres, 6 vol., 1803
- La Naissance de monseigneur le duc de Bourgogne, ode, s. d. Text online
- Lorimon, ou l'Homme tel qu'il est, 3 vol., s. d.

== Bibliography ==
- Robert L. Dawson, Baculard d'Arnaud, life and prose fiction , Oxford, SVEC, 1976
- René Debrie and Pierre Garnier, La Romance du sire de Créqui : une énigme littéraire picarde, CRDP, Amiens, 1976
- Robert Mauzi, Maintenant sur ma route, préface de Jean Ehrard, Orléans : Paradigme, 1994
