= Coligny (play) =

1730 play

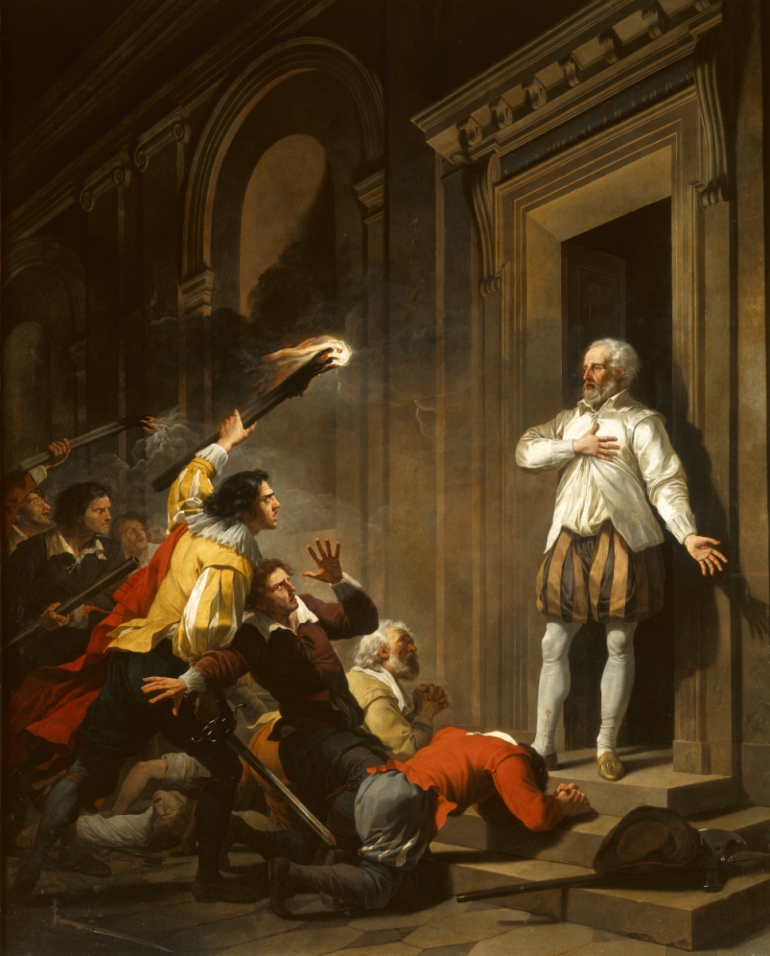
- Admiral Coligny Confronts His Assassins by Joseph-Benoît Suvée drew inspiration from the play
- Original language: French
- Written by: François-Thomas-Marie de Baculard d'Arnaud
- Genre: Tragedy
- Setting: Paris, 1572

Coligny (French: Coligni, ou la St. Barthelemi) is a 1740 tragedy by the French writer François-Thomas-Marie de Baculard d'Arnaud. It revolves around the Assassination of Admiral Coligny during the 1572 St. Bartholomew's Day Massacre in Paris. It focuses on the intolerance towards Huguenots that led to the killing. Baculard d'Arnaud drew inspiration for it from Voltaire's 1723 Henriade. Both were sources for Joseph-Benoît Suvée's 1787 painting Admiral Coligny Confronts His Assassins, a popular work that suggested growing tolerance for Protestants in the final stages of the Ancien régime after centuries of persecution.

== Bibliography ==
- Frantz, Pierre & Marchand, Sophie. Le théâtre français du XVIIIe siècle: histoire, textes choisis, mises en scène. Avant-scène théâtre, 2009.
- Mansfield, Elizabeth C. The Perfect Foil: François-André Vincent and the Revolution in French Painting. University of Minnesota Press, 2011.
- Steintrager, James A. Cruel Delight: Enlightenment Culture and the Inhuman. Indiana University Press, 2004.
