= Savvy =

Savvy may refer to:

== Arts and entertainment ==
- Savvy (novel), a 2008 children's fantasy novel by Ingrid Law
- Savvy Records, a defunct American record label
- Savvy, of the American pop duo Savvy & Mandy
- Savvy, an American pop group whose members appear in the sitcom The Wannabes
- Savvy Games Group, a Saudi video game investment company

== Products and companies ==
- Savvy Vodka, a brand of vodka
- Proton Savvy, a supermini car
- Savvy, a computer language for programming the RB5X and other robots

== People ==
- Charles M. Cooke Jr. (1886–1970), nicknamed "Savvy", United States Navy admiral
- Charles Read (naval officer) (1840–1890), nicknamed "Savvy", United States Navy and Confederate States Navy officer
- Savvy Gupta (born 1983), Indian musician, singer and composer

== See also ==
- Business acumen, business savvy or media savvy
- Common sense
- Intelligence
- Salvi (disambiguation)
- Savi (disambiguation)
- Savy (disambiguation)
