= Sawi =

Sawi may refer to:

- Sawi people, a people of the West Papua province of Indonesia
- Sawi language (Papuan), the language of the Sawi people
- Sawi language (Dardic), an Indo-Aryan language of Afghanistan
- Sawi District in Chumphon Province, Thailand
- Sawi Mosque, the oldest mosque situated in Multan, Pakistan

== See also ==
- Savi (disambiguation)
