= Admiral Coligny Confronts His Assassins =

Painting by Joseph-Benoît Suvée

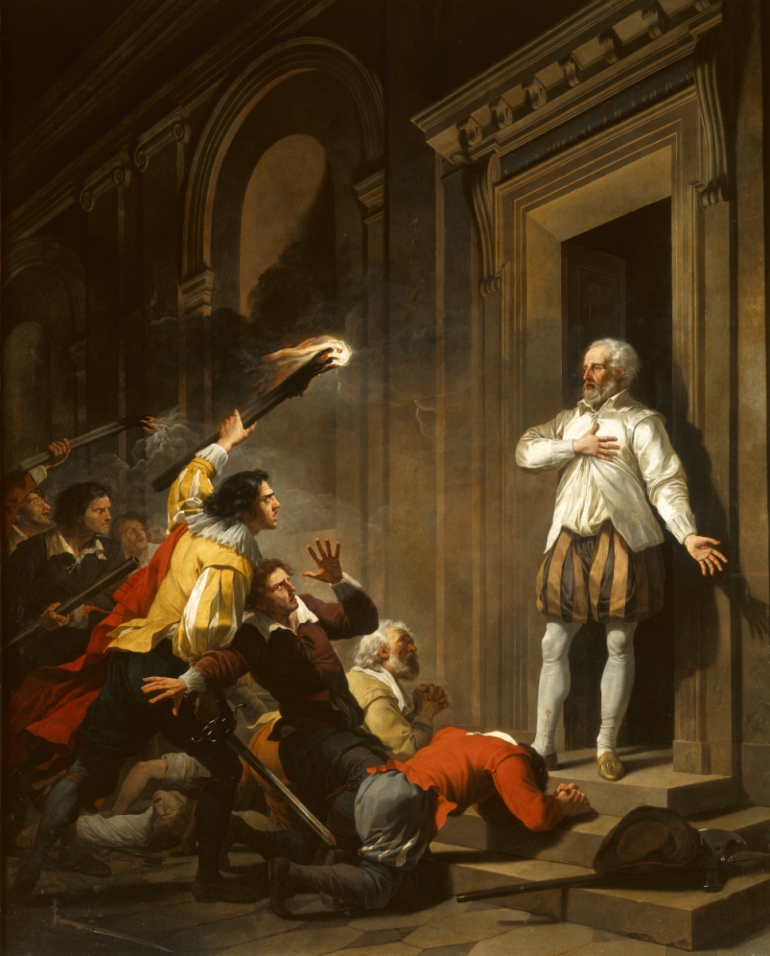
- Artist: Joseph-Benoît Suvée
- Year: 1787
- Type: Oil on canvas, history painting
- Dimensions: 324 cm × 260 cm (128 in × 100 in)
- Location: Musée des Beaux-Arts, Dijon

Admiral Coligny Confronts His Assassins or The Death of Coligny (French: L'amiral Coligny en impose à ses assassins) is an oil on canvas history painting by the Flemish artist Joseph-Benoît Suvée, from 1787.

== History and descriprion ==
If depicts the Assassination of Admiral Coligny during the French Wars of Religion. On 24 August 1572 the Huguenot leader Admiral Gaspard de Coligny was attacked by killers sent as part of the St. Bartholomew's Day Massacre. Cornered in a doorway, he defiantly confronts the mob of assassins. It was inspired by a passage in Voltaire's Henriade and Baculard d'Arnaud's subsequent play Coligny.

Stylistically Neoclassical, it reflects a growing tendency to depict scenes from French history, encouraged by the Count of Angiviller. Although a state commission, Angiviller gave Suvée a free band to choose his subject and he settled on this scene backing greater tolerance for French Protestants. Suvée had been a pupil of Joseph-Marie Vien at the same time as his friend François-André Vincent Vincent had also portrayed a violent confrontation in the streets of Paris President Molé Confronted by Insurgents at the Salon of 1779.

The painting was displayed at the Salon of 1787 held at the Louvre in Paris. It was unprecedented in its scene of showing a Protestant as a heroic martyr in the staunchly Roman Catholic Ancien Regime, suggesting a growing tolerance towards the Huguenot minority in the years before the French Revolution. Today it is in the collection of the Musée des Beaux-Arts de Dijon, having been transferred there in 2010.

== Bibliography ==
- Crow, Thomas E. Painters and Public Life in Eighteenth-century Paris. Yale University Press, 1985.
- Mansfield, Elizabeth C. The Perfect Foil: François-André Vincent and the Revolution in French Painting. University of Minnesota Press, 2011.
- Smith, Anthony D. The Nation Made Real: Art and National Identity in Western Europe, 1600-1850. OUP Oxford, 2013.
