= Salvetti =

Salvetti is an Italian surname. Notable people with the surname include:

- Alida Maria Salvetti (1941–1991), Italian operatic soprano
- Antonio Salvetti (1854–1931), Italian architect and painter
- Emiliano Salvetti (born 1974), Italian footballer
- Lorenzo Salvetti (born 2007), Italian singer-songwriter
- Maria Vittoria Salvetti, Italian aerospace engineer
