= Salvini =

Salvini may refer to

- Salvini (surname)
  - Matteo Salvini, Italian deputy prime minister
    - Us with Salvini (Italian: Noi con Salvini), a populist political party founded by him
  - Tommaso Salvini 19th century actor and part inspiration for Stanislavsky
- Adelson e Salvini (Adelson and Salvini), a three-act opera semi-seria composed by Vincenzo Bellini
- The specific epithet in some scientific names of species, such as Salvin's curassow, Salvin's prion and others
