= Savi (disambiguation) =

Savi was the capital of the 17th- and 18th-century African Kingdom of Whydah, in modern Benin.

Savi or SAVI may also refer to:

- Savi, Benin, a town and arrondissement
- Savi language, a Dardic language of Afghanistan
- Savi Technology, a U.S. company
- Stimulator of interferon genes, a protein that in humans is encoded by the TMEM173 gene
- Soil-adjusted vegetation index, a vegetation index used in Earth remote sensing
- Savi, plural of savio, a Venetian office
- Savi (film), a 2024 Indian action thriller film

== People with the surname ==
- Gaetano Savi (1769–1844; standard author abbreviation Savi), Italian botanist
- Paolo Savi (1798–1871), Italian geologist and ornithologist
- Toomas Savi (born 1942), Estonian politician
- Filippo Savi (born 1987), Italian football player

== See also ==
- Savy (disambiguation)
- Savvy (disambiguation)
