= Savy =

Savy may refer to:

== People ==
- Bernard-Claude Savy (1922–1997), French physician, publisher and politician
- Honoré Savy (1725-1790), French ceramics factory founder
- Jean Savy (1906–1993), French resistance member
- Savy King (born 2005), American soccer player

== Places ==
- Savy, Aisne, France
- Savy-Berlette, France

== See also ==
- Savvy (disambiguation)
