= Enea Scala =

Italian opera singer

- Born: Ragusa, Sicily, Italy
- Education: Bologna Conservatory
- Occupation: Operatic tenor

Enea Scala (born 19 May 1979) is an Italian operatic tenor in the belcanto field, known internationally as a performer of Rossini's roles such as Rinaldo in Armida, Argirio in Tancredi, Pirro in Hermione, Idreno in Semiramide and Otello. He has appeared at major opera houses and festivals, and has made recordings.

== Career ==
Scala was born in Ragusa, Sicily, Italy. Singing in choirs as a teenager inspired his wish to train his voice. He took voice lessons, and listened to recordings of bel canto opera. He then moved to Bologna for professional studies at the Bologna Conservatory.

Scala made his debut at the Teatro Comunale di Bologna in 2006. He has performed leading bel canto roles such as Rossini's Lindoro in L'italiana in Algeri. He appeared as Alberto in L'occasione fa il ladro at the Rossini Opera Festival in Pesaro. With the title role of Mascagni's L'amico Fritz, Alfredo in Verdi's La traviata and Fenton in Falstaff, Scala moved towards more lyric characters. His first German role was Alfred in Die Fledermaus by Johann Strauss at the Deutsche Oper Berlin. He appeared as Argirio in Rossini's Tancredi at La Monnaie in Brussels, as Idreno in Semiramide at La Fenice in Venice, and as the Duke of Mantua in Verdi's Rigoletto at the Opéra de Marseille and the Macerata Opera. Scala first appeared at the Royal Opera House in 2015 as Ruodi in Rossini's Guglielmo Tell. He performed as Alfredo at the New Zealand Opera in 2017. In September 2019, Scala appeared in the title role of Rossini's Otello at the Oper Frankfurt, alongside Nino Machaidze as Desdemona. The opera requires at least five tenors, three of whom have to perform demanding coloraturas. A reviewer noted his powerful voice with a slightly dark timbre and ringing high notes ("... kräftigem, leicht dunkel eingefärbtem Tenor, der in den Höhen eine enorme Durchschlagskraft besitzt"). Another reviewer described the brilliance of his coloraturas up to "stratospheric" heights, and noted his convincing dramatic portrayal of the character.

== Recordings ==
Scala performed in 2014 the role of Comte Belfiore in Mozart's La finta giardiniera in a production of the Opéra de Lille recorded as DVD, with Emmanuelle Haïm conducting Le Concert d'Astrée. In a 2015 recording of Rossini's Armida, Scala performed the leading role of Rinaldo. A reviewer noted his "ringing voice and good runs", especially in a trio of three tenors described as "fluid and resounding" voices. In 2016, he performed in a BBC production of Bellini's first opera, Adelson e Salvini, in a title role with the BBC Symphony Orchestra conducted by Daniele Rustioni. The production was recorded.
