= Adelson e Salvini =

Opera by Vincenzo Bellini

- Opera by Vincenzo Bellini
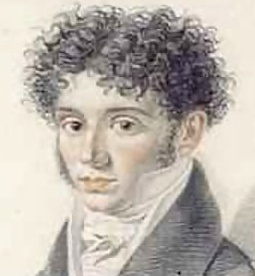
- Bellini as a young man
- Librettist: Andrea Leone Tottola
- Language: Italian
- Based on: Baculard d'Arnaud's novel Épreuves du Sentiment
- Premiere: 12 February 1825; Teatro del Conservatorio di San Sebastiano, Naples

Adelson e Salvini (Adelson and Salvini) is a three-act opera semiseria composed by Vincenzo Bellini from a libretto by Andrea Leone Tottola. The opera was based on the 1772 novel Épreuves du Sentiment by François-Thomas-Marie de Baculard d'Arnaud, and it draws on a previously performed French play of 1803 by Prospère Delamare.

== Composition history ==
Bellini's first opera was written as his final project at the Naples San Sebastiano Conservatory, when the composer was 23 years old. It was the custom at the Conservatory to introduce promising students to the public with a dramatic work. Bellini styled his project an opera semi-seria, and it was first performed at the Teatro del Conservatorio di San Sebastiano in Naples sometime between mid-January and mid-March 1825, although David Kimbell states 12 February 1825. Herbert Weinstock attributes the uncertainty as to the exact date to a series of deaths of several prominent people (including Bourbon King Ferdinand I), which caused all public entertainment to stop during periods of mourning.

"With a view to professional staging", various revisions were undertaken between 1826 and 1828, but the opera was never performed professionally.

== Performance history ==
Bellini's score does not bring out much of the humour of the piece. Nevertheless, the work was so popular among the Conservatory's student audience that it was performed every Sunday for a year.

It was successful enough to generate a commission from the royal court, after it had captured the interest of the impresario Domenico Barbaja of the San Carlo Opera. Barbaja launched Bellini's career, commissioning him to write his next work, Bianca e Gernando in 1826, which was revised two years later as Bianca e Fernando.

Although much influenced by the music of Gioachino Rossini, Adelson e Salvini exhibits some of the characteristic tuneful style and delicate vocal line that Bellini achieved in his mature works. Characteristically, Bellini was to re-use some of the music from this opera in later works, notably Nelly's act 1 Romanza "Dopo l'oscuro nembo" which became Giulietta's aria "O quante volte" in I Capuleti e i Montecchi. This was the only Bellini opera provided with recitativo secco.

Bellini greatly revised the opera for another production in 1829 and later revised it further. However, the first professional production was not given for over 100 years at the Teatro Metropolitan, in Bellini's home town of Catania, on 6 November 1985. Domenico De Meo further revised and edited the score of Adelson to prepare it for a 1992 production at the Teatro Massimo Bellini in Catania, Sicily. The following year, the Italian label Nuova Era issued Adelson e Salvini on compact discs.

== Roles ==
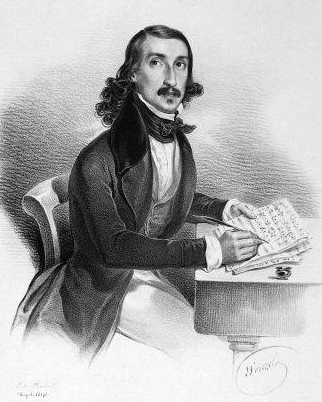
Giacinto Marras

Roles, voice types, premier cast
Role	Voice type	Premiere cast, 12 February 1825
Nelly	soprano	Giacinto Marras (en travesti)
Fanny	contralto	
Madame Rivers	contralto	Luigi Rotellini (en travesti)
Salvini, friend of Adelson	tenor	Leonardo Perugini
Lord Adelson	baritone	Antonio Manzi
Struley	bass	Talamo
Bonifacio, servant of Salvini	bass	Giuseppe Ruggiero
Geronio	bass	Ciotola

== Synopsis ==
Place: Ireland
Time: 17th century

Lord Adelson, who is traveling, hosts in his castle his orphan girlfriend, Nelly, and his friend Salvini, an Italian painter who is secretly in love with her and is secretly loved by Fanny, a young Irishwoman to whom he gives painting lessons. Colonel Struley, Nelly's uncle, who was proscribed with his family several years ago by Adelson's father, has had Geronio engaged as a servant at the castle to try a second time to kidnap his niece in order to take revenge on the Adelson family.

=== Act 1 ===
Torn between his love of Nelly and his friendship for Adelson, Salvini thinks of suicide, while his Neapolitan servant, Bonifacio Beccheria, tries to comfort him with bizarre reasoning. Salvini is preoccupied, among other things, by a problem of conscience: he has been holding back for ten days a letter that Adelson sent him to give to Nelly. When Nelly sees him with this letter in his hand and asks him as a sign of confidence to read it, Salvini invents bad news: by the will of his uncle, Adelson is forced to break his engagement with her and marry the daughter of a duke. Nelly faints, Salvini takes the opportunity to kiss her, and she flees, after regaining consciousness and hearing his declaration of love.

Adelson returns to the castle, greeted with shouts of joy, but is surprised not to see his painter friend in the crowd.

=== Act 2 ===
Everything is ready for the marriage of Adelson and Nelly, but the absence of the painter preoccupies the squire. Adelson finally finds Salvini about to kill himself and stops him. Believing that this gesture is dictated by an unhappy love and that Fanny is the object of this love, he undertakes to sacrifice everything to make his friend happy. Salvini thanks him with all his heart, believing that Adelson is giving him Nelly's hand.

Left alone, Salvini is approached by Struley, who intends to take advantage of the painter's passion for Nelly to execute his criminal plan. The outlaw deceives him by saying that Adelson is already married in secret to Milady Artur and that the engagement and the marriage with Nelly are only the deception of a skilful deceiver.

Struley has a low house burned (casa bassa) located at the end of the castle park so that, while everyone runs to the scene of the disaster, his men can kidnap Nelly. After having reported the alleged deception to the girl, Salvini first conspires with the Colonel and Geronio to remove her from Adelson, then sides with Nelly when she invokes his protection and finds that only revenge motivates Struley. After being detained by Geronio, he goes after the kidnappers.

The fire is under control, but far off there is a gunshot.

=== Act 3 (first version) ===
Adelson, who is sitting in his capacity as cantonal judge and who finally understands that Salvini is in love with Nelly while questioning Bonifacio, makes the painter appear. The latter tells how he killed Nelly, in wanting to stab the uncle. He wants to die, but Adelson takes revenge for his unfaithful friendship by forcing him first to see Nelly's corpse. Salvini realizes then that Nelly has not been hurt. The engaged couple get ready to get married and the painter silences his feelings.

=== End of act 2 (second version) ===
Bonifacio reports that Salvini killed Geronio and was injured by Struley, but managed to save Nelly. Salvini hands her over to his friend. Reason having prevailed over love, he decides to leave for Rome to stay a year before returning to marry Fanny.

== Recordings ==
Year	Cast: Salvini, Nelly, Adelson, Fanny	Conductor, opera house and orchestra	Label
1985	Bengt Gustavson, Carina Morling, Thomas Lander, Ingrid Tobiasson	Anders-Per Jonnson, Orchestra of the Royal Swedish Opera and the Stockholm Chamber Chorus; Live recording; 2nd version, 1828	3 LP records: Bongiovanni; Cat: GB 2034–2036
1992	Bradley Williams, Alicia Nafé, Fabio Previati, Lucia Rizzi	Andrea Licata, EAR Teatro Massimo Bellini Orchestra and Chorus, Catania (Audio and video recordings of a performance (or of performances) at Catania, November); 2nd version, 1828	CD: Nuova Era; Cat: 7154-55; DVD: House of Opera, Cat: DVDCC 109
2017	Enea Scala, Daniela Barcellona, Simone Alberghini, Kathryn Rudge	Daniele Rustioni, Opera Rara Chorus, BBC Symphony Orchestra; 1st Version, 1825	CD: Opera Rara; Cat: ORC56

== Bibliography ==
- Kimbell, David (2001). "Adelson and Salvini". In Holden, Amanda (ed.). The New Penguin Opera Guide. New York: Penguin Putnam. ISBN 0-140-29312-4.
- Rosselli, John (1996). The Life of Bellini. New York: Cambridge University Press. ISBN 0-521-46781-0.
- Weinstock, Herbert (1971). Bellini: His Life and His Operas. New York: Knopf. ISBN 0394416562.
