= Maria Vittoria Salvetti =

Italian aerospace engineer

Maria Vittoria Salvetti is an Italian aerospace engineer specializing in computational fluid dynamics and especially in the large eddy simulation of turbulence and complex flows. She is a professor of fluid dynamics at the University of Pisa, where she directs the Department of Civil and Industrial Engineering.

== Education and career ==
Salvetti earned a laurea in aerospace engineering from the University of Pisa in 1989. She completed a PhD in engineering science at the Université Nice-Sophia-Antipolis in France in 1993. Her research involved the simulation of hypersonic flows occurring in atmospheric entry, and was carried out at the French Institute for Research in Computer Science and Automation (INRIA). Her dissertation, Modelisation numerique et physique de couches de choc en regime hypersonique, was supervised by Alain Dervieux.

She was a postdoctoral researcher at the University of California, Santa Barbara and Stanford University, and returned to the University of Pisa as an assistant professor in 1993. She became associate professor in 2001 and full professor in 2012.
