= St. Bartholomew's Day massacre =

1572 killing of Huguenots in France

- Part of the French Wars of Religion
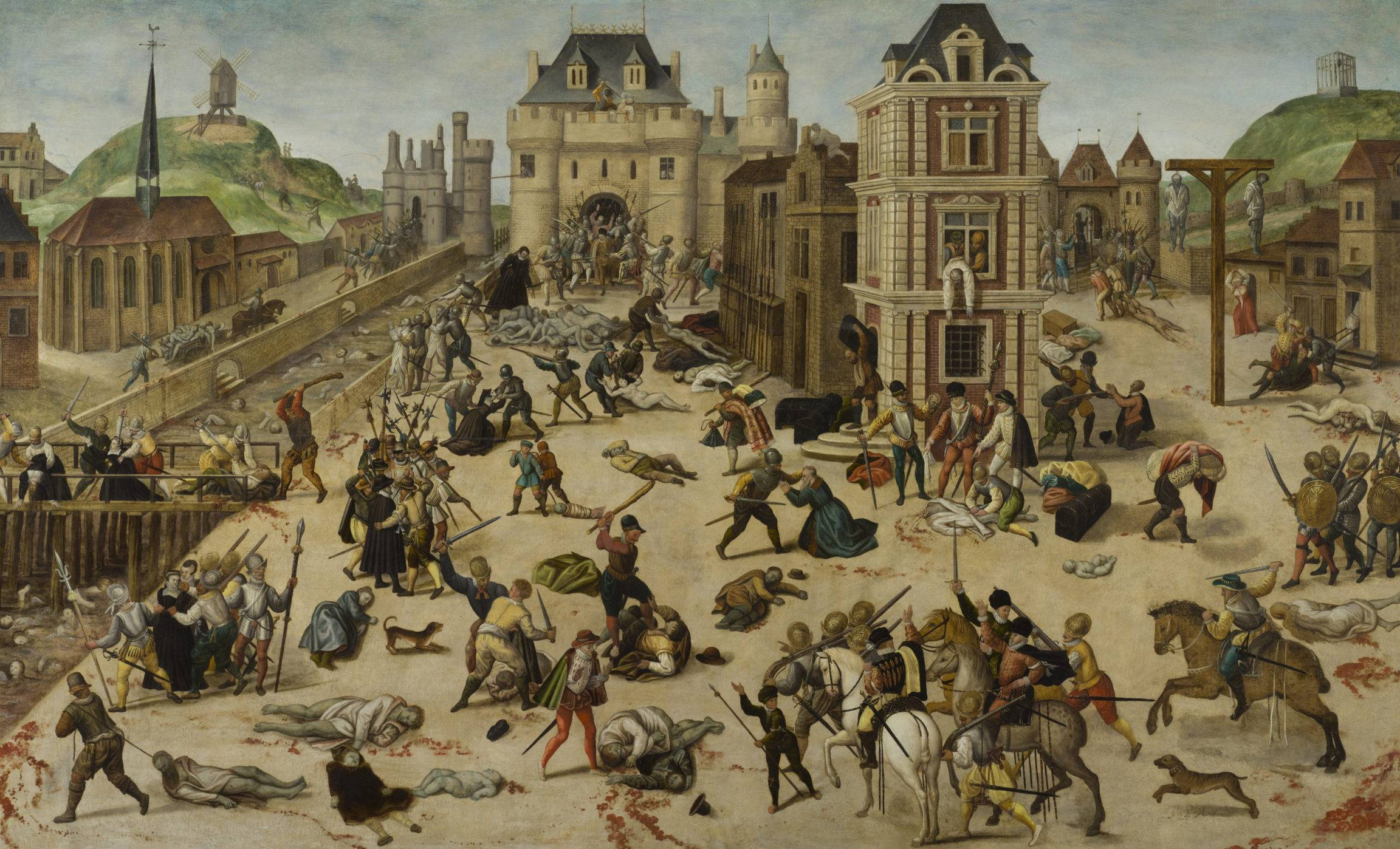
- Painting by François Dubois, a Huguenot painter who fled France after the massacre. Although it is not known whether Dubois witnessed the event, he depicts Admiral Coligny's body hanging out of a window at the rear to the right. To the left rear, Catherine de' Medici is shown emerging from the Louvre Palace to inspect a heap of bodies.
- Location: Kingdom of France
- Date: 1572
- Target: French Protestants
- Attack type: Mob violence, massacres, mass murder
- Deaths: 5,000–30,000
- Perpetrator: Catholic mobs
- Motive: Anti-Protestantism

The Saint Bartholomew's Day massacre (French: Massacre de la Saint-Barthélemy) in 1572 was a targeted group of assassinations and a wave of Catholic mob violence directed against the Huguenots (French Calvinist Protestants) during the French Wars of Religion. Traditionally believed to have been instigated by Queen Catherine de' Medici, the mother of King Charles IX, the massacre started a few days after the marriage on 18 August of the king's sister Margaret to the Protestant King Henry III of Navarre. Many of the wealthiest and most prominent Huguenots had gathered in largely Catholic Paris to attend the wedding.

The massacre began in the night of 23–24 August 1572, the eve of the Feast of Saint Bartholomew, two days after the attempted assassination of Admiral Gaspard de Coligny, the military and political leader of the Huguenots. King Charles IX ordered the killing of a group of Huguenot leaders, including Coligny, and the slaughter spread throughout Paris. Lasting several weeks in all, the massacre expanded outward to the countryside and other urban centres. Modern estimates for the number of dead across France vary widely, from 5,000 to 30,000.

The massacre marked a turning point in the French Wars of Religion. The Huguenot political movement was crippled by the loss of many of its prominent aristocratic leaders, and many rank-and-file members subsequently converted. Those who remained became increasingly radicalised. Though by no means unique, the bloodletting "was the worst of the century's religious massacres". Throughout Europe, it "printed on Protestant minds the indelible conviction that Catholicism was a bloody and treacherous religion".

== Background ==
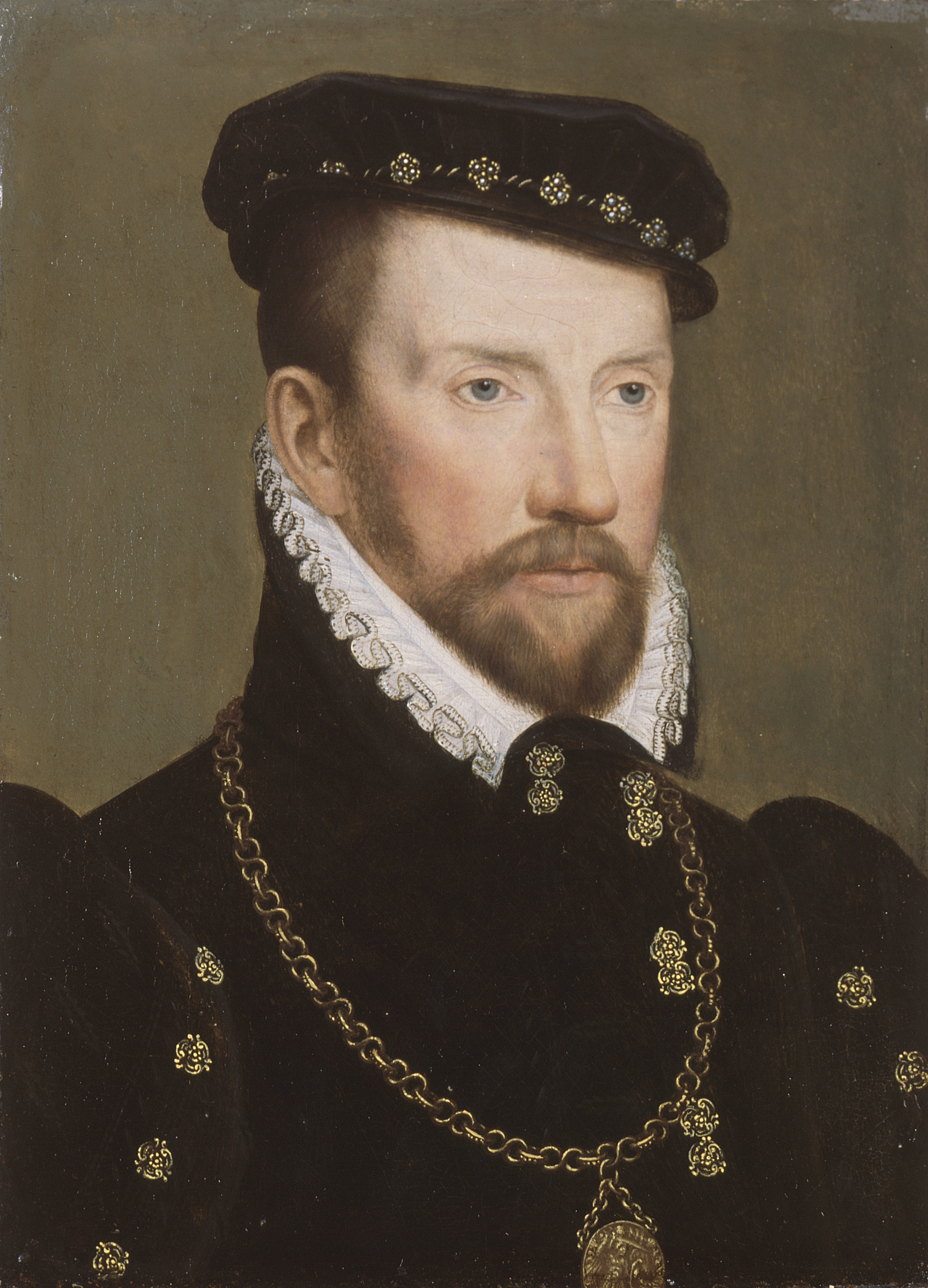
Admiral Gaspard de Coligny, the leader of the Huguenots

The Massacre of Saint Bartholomew's Day was the culmination of a series of events:

- The Peace of Saint-Germain-en-Laye, which put an end to the third war of religion on 8 August 1570.
- The marriage between Henry III of Navarre and Margaret of Valois on 18 August 1572.
- The failed assassination of Admiral de Coligny on 22 August 1572.

=== Unacceptable peace and marriage ===
The Peace of Saint-Germain put an end to three years of civil war between Catholics and Protestants. This peace, however, was precarious, since the more intransigent Catholics refused to accept it. The strongly Catholic Guise family was out of favour at the French court; the Huguenot leader, Admiral Gaspard de Coligny, was readmitted into the king's council in September 1571. Staunch Catholics were shocked by the return of Protestants to the court, but the queen mother, Catherine de' Medici, and her son, Charles IX, were practical in their support of peace and Coligny, as they were conscious of the kingdom's financial difficulties and the Huguenots' strong defensive position: they controlled the fortified towns of La Rochelle, La Charité-sur-Loire, Cognac, and Montauban.

To cement the peace between the two religious parties, Catherine planned to marry her daughter Margaret to the Protestant Henry of Navarre (the future King Henry IV), son of the Huguenot leader Queen Jeanne d'Albret. The royal marriage was arranged for 18 August 1572. It was not accepted by traditionalist Catholics or by the Pope. Both the Pope and King Philip II of Spain strongly condemned Catherine's Huguenot policy as well.

=== Tension in Paris ===
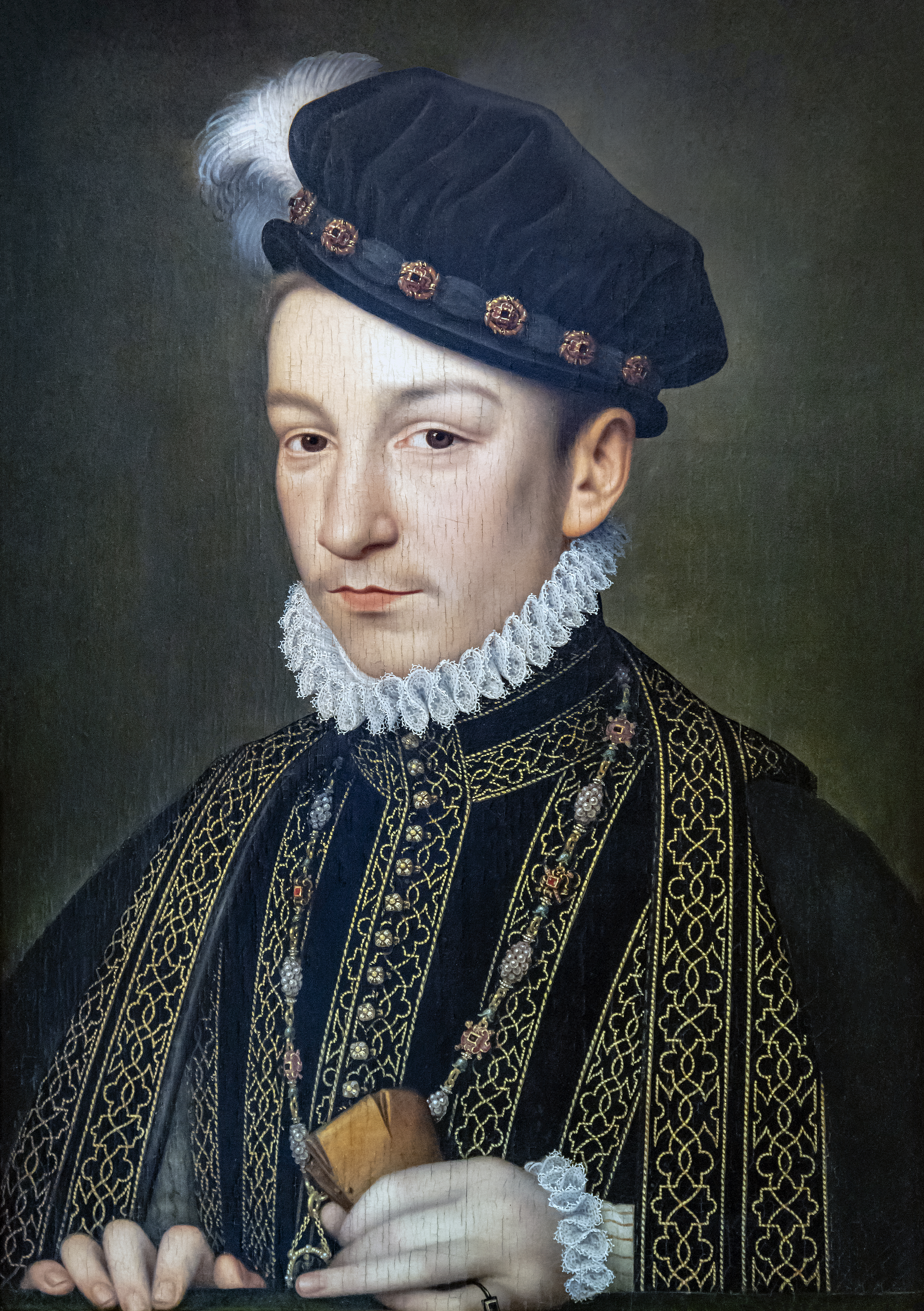
Charles IX of France, who was 22 years old in August 1572, by François Clouet.

The impending marriage led to the gathering of a large number of well-born Protestants in Paris, but Paris was a violently anti-Huguenot city, and Parisians, who tended to be extreme Catholics, found their presence unacceptable. Encouraged by Catholic preachers, they were horrified at the marriage of a princess of France to a Protestant. The Parlement's opposition and the court's absence from the wedding led to increased political tension.

Compounding this bad feeling was that the harvests had been poor and taxes had risen. The rise in food prices and the luxury displayed on the occasion of the royal wedding increased tensions among the common people. A particular point of tension was an open-air cross erected on the site of the house of Philippe de Gastine, a Huguenot who had been executed in 1569. The mob had torn down his house and erected a large wooden cross on a stone base. Under the terms of the peace, and after considerable popular resistance, this had been removed in December 1571 (and re-erected in a cemetery), which had already led to about 50 deaths in riots, as well as mob destruction of property. In the massacres of August, the relatives of the Gastines family were among the first to be killed by the mob.

The court itself was extremely divided. Catherine had not obtained Pope Gregory XIII's permission to celebrate this irregular marriage; consequently, the French prelates hesitated over which attitude to adopt. It took all the queen mother's skill to convince the Cardinal de Bourbon (paternal uncle of the Protestant groom, but himself a Catholic clergyman) to marry the couple. Beside this, the rivalries between the leading families re-emerged. The Guises were not prepared to make way for their rivals, the House of Montmorency. François, Duke of Montmorency and governor of Paris, was unable to control the disturbances in the city. On 20 August, he left the capital and retired to Chantilly.

=== Huguenot intervention in the Netherlands ===
Tensions were further raised when in May 1572 the news reached Paris that a French Huguenot army under Louis of Nassau had crossed from France to the Netherlandish province of Hainaut and captured the Catholic strongholds of Mons and Valenciennes (now in Belgium and France, respectively). Louis governed the Principality of Orange around Avignon in southern France for his brother William the Silent, who was leading the Dutch Revolt against the Spanish. This intervention threatened to involve France in that war; many Catholics believed that Coligny had again persuaded the king to intervene on the side of the Dutch, as he had managed to do the previous October, before Catherine had got the decision reversed.

=== Attempted assassination of Admiral de Coligny ===
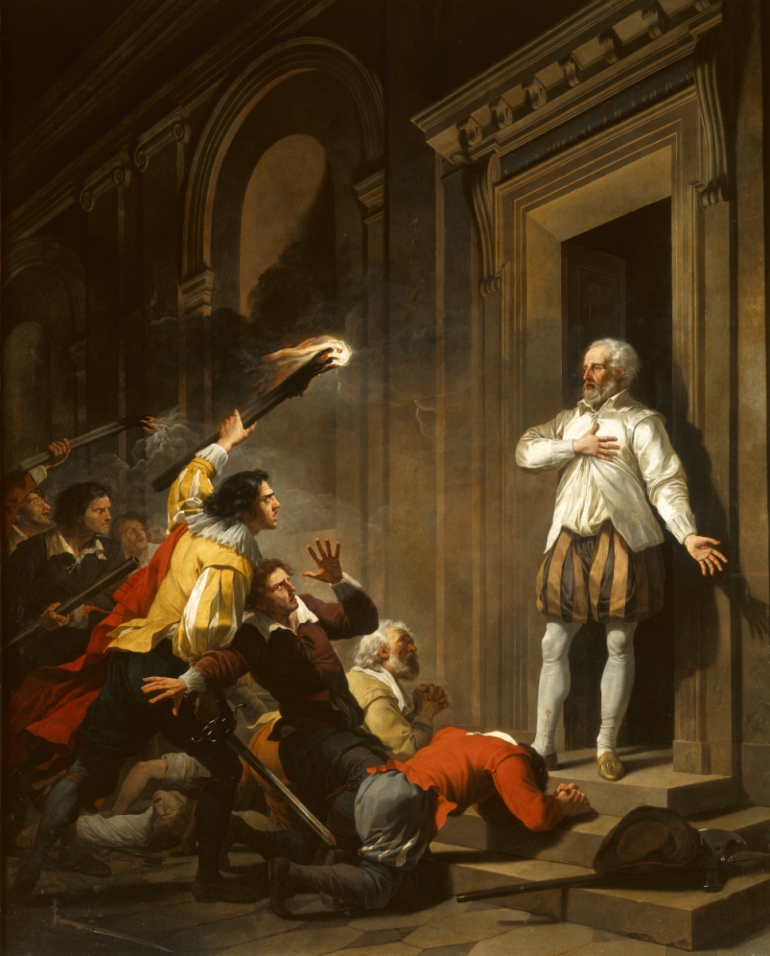
Admiral Coligny Confronts His Assassins by Joseph-Benoît Suvée, 1787

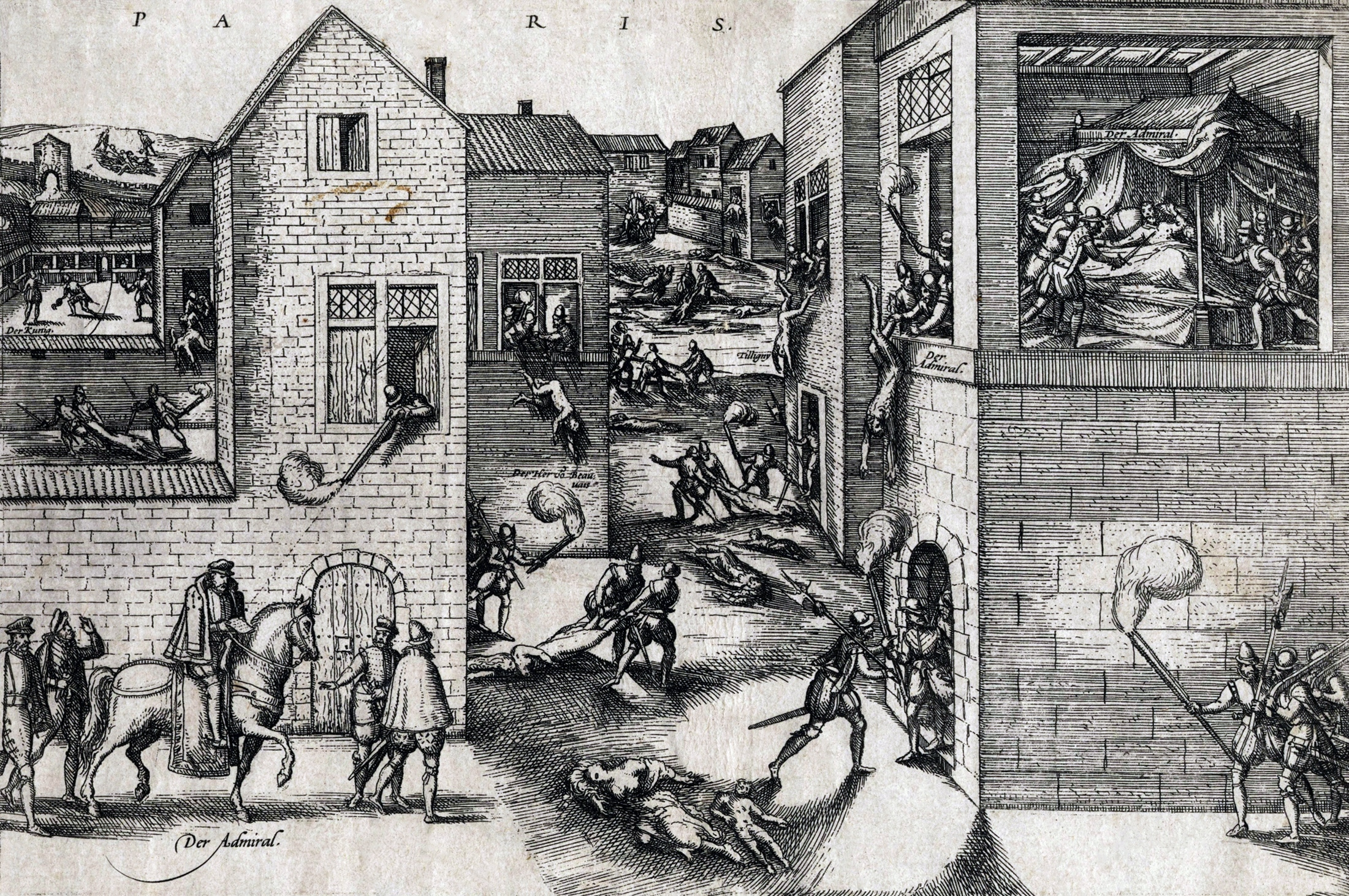
This popular print by Frans Hogenberg shows the attempted assassination of Coligny at left, his subsequent murder at right, and scenes of the general massacre in the streets.

After the wedding of Catholic Marguerite de Valois and Huguenot Henry de Navarre on 18 August 1572, Coligny and the leading Huguenots remained in Paris to discuss some outstanding grievances about the Peace of St. Germain with the king. An attempt was made on Coligny's life a few days later on 22 August as he made his way back to his house from the Louvre. He was shot from an upstairs window, and seriously wounded. The would-be assassin, most likely Charles de Louviers, Lord of Maurevert (c. 1505–1583), escaped in the ensuing confusion. Other theories about who was ultimately responsible for the attack centre on three candidates:

- The Guises: the Cardinal of Lorraine (who was in Rome at the time), and his nephews, the Dukes of Guise and Aumale, are the most likely suspects. The leaders of the Catholic party, they wanted to avenge the death of the two dukes' father Francis, Duke of Guise, whose assassination ten years earlier they believed to have been ordered by Coligny. The shot aimed at Admiral de Coligny came from a house belonging to the Guises.
- The Duke of Alba: he governed the Netherlands on behalf of Philip II. Coligny planned to lead a campaign in the Netherlands to participate in the Dutch Revolt to free the region from Spanish control. During the summer, Coligny had secretly dispatched a number of troops to help the Protestants in Mons, who were now besieged by the Duke of Alba. So Admiral de Coligny was a real threat to the latter.
- Catherine de' Medici: according to tradition, the Queen Mother had been worried that the king was increasingly becoming dominated by Coligny. Among other things, Catherine reportedly feared that Coligny's influence would drag France into a war with Spain over the Netherlands.

== Massacres ==
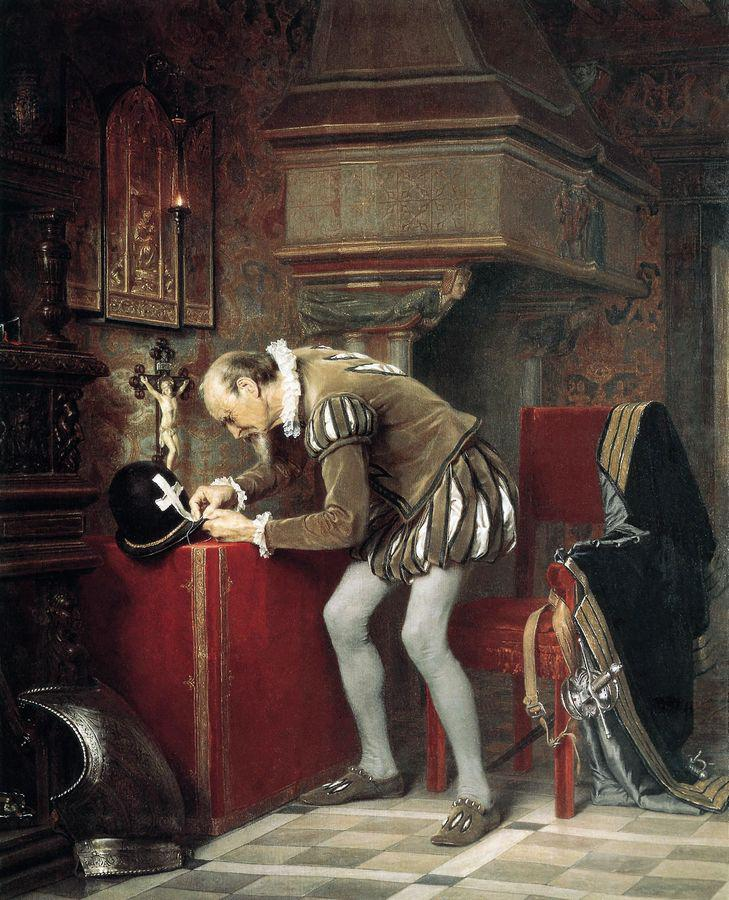
Preparation for the St. Bartholomew's Day massacre. Painting by Kārlis Hūns (1868).

=== Paris ===
The attempted assassination of Coligny triggered the crisis that led to the massacre. Admiral de Coligny was the most respected Huguenot leader and enjoyed a close relationship with the king, although he was distrusted by the king's mother. Aware of the danger of reprisals from the Protestants, the king and his court visited Coligny on his sickbed and promised him that the culprits would be punished. While the Queen Mother was eating dinner, Protestants burst in to demand justice, some talking in menacing terms. Fears of Huguenot reprisals grew. Coligny's brother-in-law led a 4,000-strong army camped just outside Paris and, although there is no evidence it was planning to attack, Catholics in the city feared it might take revenge on the Guises or the city populace itself.

That evening, Catherine held a meeting at the Tuileries Palace with her Italian advisers, including Albert de Gondi, Comte de Retz. On the evening of 23 August, Catherine went to see the king to discuss the crisis. Though no details of the meeting survive, Charles IX and his mother apparently made the decision to eliminate the Protestant leaders. Holt speculated this entailed "between two and three dozen noblemen" who were still in Paris. Other historians are reluctant to speculate on the composition or size of the group of leaders targeted at this point, beyond the few obvious heads. Like Coligny, most potential candidates for elimination were accompanied by groups of gentlemen who served as staff and bodyguards, so murdering them would also have involved killing their retainers as a necessity.

Shortly after this decision, the municipal authorities of Paris were summoned. They were ordered to shut the city gates and arm the citizenry to prevent any attempt at a Protestant uprising. The king's Swiss mercenaries were given the task of killing a list of leading Protestants. It is difficult today to determine the exact chronology of events, or to know the precise moment the killing began. It seems probable that a signal was given by ringing bells for matins (between midnight and dawn) at the church of Saint-Germain l'Auxerrois, near the Louvre, which was the parish church of the kings of France. The Swiss mercenaries expelled the Protestant nobles from the Louvre Castle and then slaughtered them in the streets.

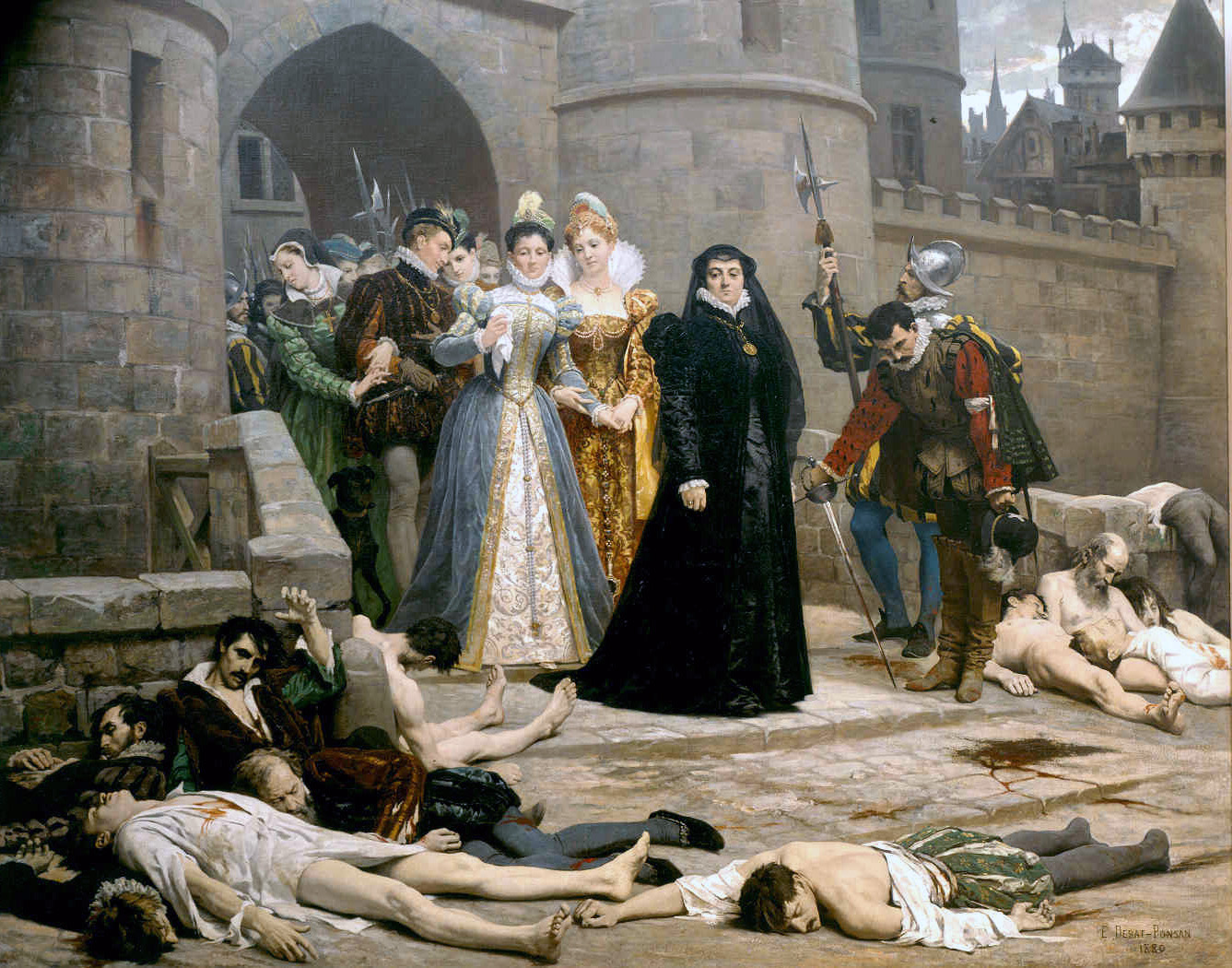
One morning at the gates of the Louvre, 19th-century painting by Édouard Debat-Ponsan. Catherine de' Medici is in black. The scene from Dubois (above) re-imagined.

In the Holy Innocents' Cemetery, on 24 August at noon, a hawthorn bush, that had withered for months, began to green again near an image of the Virgin. That was interpreted by the Parisians as a sign of divine blessing and approval to these multiple murders, and that night, a group led by Guise in person dragged Admiral Coligny from his bed, killed him, and threw his body out of a window. The terrified Huguenot nobles in the building initially put up a fight, hoping to save the life of their leader, but Coligny himself seemed unperturbed. According to the contemporary French historian Jacques Auguste de Thou, one of Coligny's murderers was struck by how calmly he accepted his fate, and remarked that "he never saw anyone less afraid in so great a peril, nor die more steadfastly".

The tension that had been building since the Peace of St. Germain now exploded in a wave of popular violence. The common people began to hunt Protestants throughout the city, including women and children. Chains were used to block streets so that Protestants could not escape from their houses. The bodies of the dead were collected in carts and thrown into the Seine. The massacre in Paris lasted three days despite the king's attempts to stop it. Holt concludes that "while the general massacre might have been prevented, there is no evidence that it was intended by any of the elites at court", listing a number of cases where Catholic courtiers intervened to save individual Protestants who were not in the leadership. Recent research by Jérémie Foa, investigating the prosopography suggests that the massacres were carried by a group of militants who had already made out lists of Protestants deserving extermination, and the mass of the population, whether approving or disapproving, were not directly involved.

The two leading Huguenots, Henry of Navarre and his cousin the Prince of Condé (respectively aged 19 and 20), were spared as they pledged to convert to Catholicism; both would eventually renounce their conversions when they managed to escape Paris. According to some interpretations, the survival of these Huguenots was a key point in Catherine's overall scheme, to prevent the House of Guise from becoming too powerful.

On 26 August, the king and court established the official version of events by going to the Paris Parlement. "Holding a lit de justice, Charles declared that he had ordered the massacre in order to thwart a Huguenot plot against the royal family." A jubilee celebration, including a procession, was then held, while the killings continued in parts of the city.

=== Provinces ===
Although Charles had dispatched orders to his provincial governors on 24 August to prevent violence and maintain the terms of the 1570 edict, from August to October, similar massacres of Huguenots took place in a total of twelve other cities: Toulouse, Bordeaux, Lyon, Bourges, Rouen, Orléans, Meaux, Angers, La Charité, Saumur, Gaillac and Troyes. In most of them, the killings swiftly followed the arrival of the news of the Paris massacre, but in some places there was a delay of more than a month. According to Mack P. Holt: "All twelve cities where provincial massacres occurred had one striking feature in common; they were all cities with Catholic majorities where there had once been significant Protestant minorities.... All of them had also experienced serious religious division... during the first three civil wars... Moreover seven of them shared a previous experience ... [they] had actually been taken over by Protestant minorities during the first civil war..."

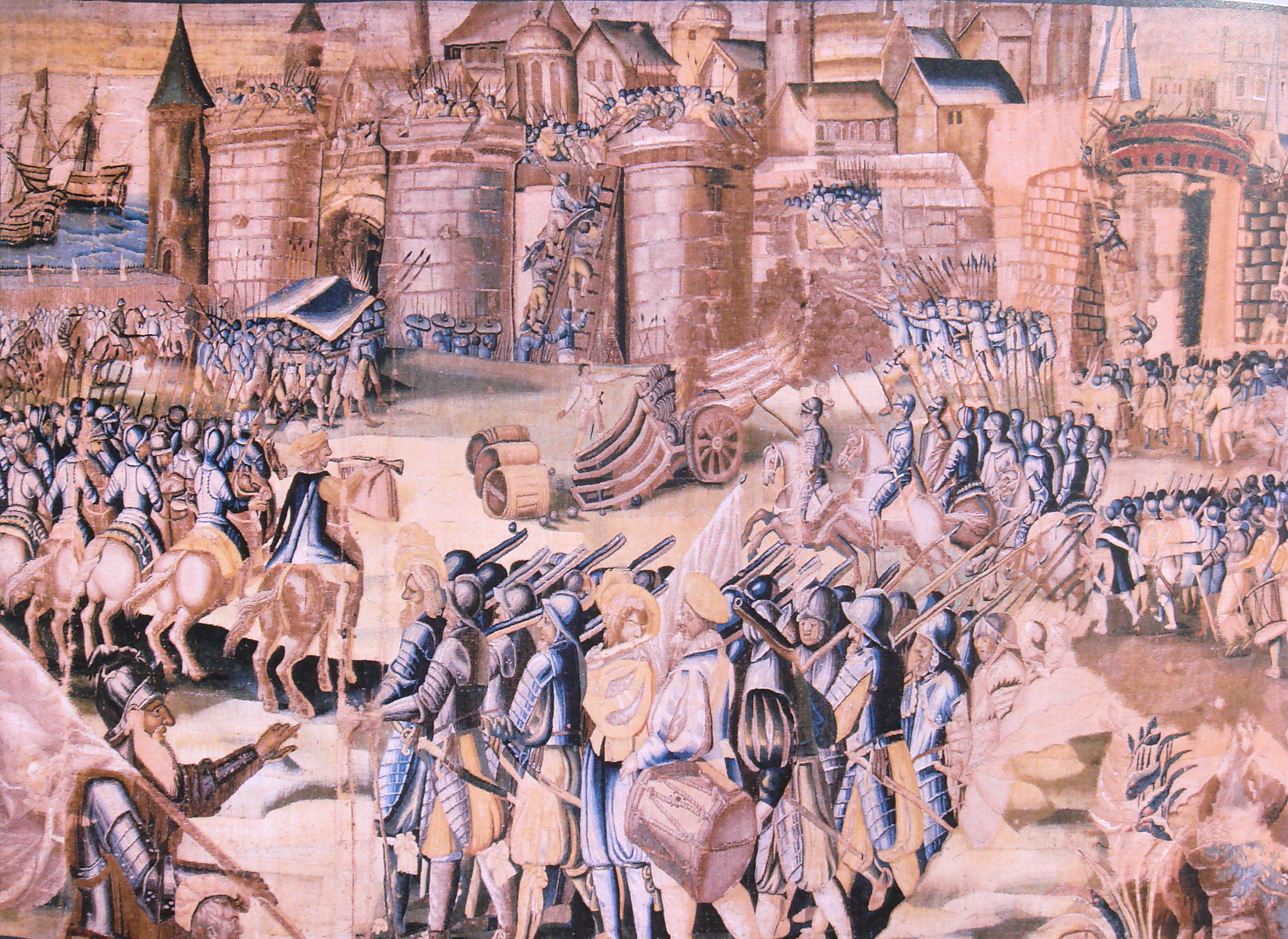
The Siege of La Rochelle (1572–1573) began soon after the St. Bartholomew massacre.

In several cases the Catholic party in the city believed they had received orders from the king to begin the massacre, some conveyed by visitors to the city, and in other cases apparently coming from a local nobleman or his agent. It seems unlikely any such orders came from the king, although the Guise faction may have desired the massacres.

Apparently genuine letters from the Duke of Anjou, the king's younger brother, did urge massacres in the king's name; in Nantes the mayor fortunately held on to his without publicising it until a week later when contrary orders from the king had arrived. In some cities the massacres were led by the mob, while the city authorities tried to suppress them, and in others small groups of soldiers and officials began rounding up Protestants with little mob involvement. In Bordeaux the inflammatory sermon on 29 September of a Jesuit, Edmond Auger, encouraged the massacre that was to occur a few days later.

In the cities affected, the loss to the Huguenot communities after the massacres was numerically far larger than those actually killed; in the following weeks there were mass conversions to Catholicism, apparently in response to the threatening atmosphere for Huguenots in these cities. In Rouen, where some hundreds were killed, the Huguenot community shrank from 16,500 to fewer than 3,000 mainly as a result of conversions and emigration to safer cities or countries. Some cities unaffected by the violence nevertheless witnessed a sharp decline in their Huguenot population. It has been claimed that the Huguenot community represented as much as 10% of the French population on the eve of the St. Bartholomew's Day massacre, declining to 7–8% by the end of the 16th century, and further after heavy persecution began once again during the reign of Louis XIV, culminating with the Revocation of the Edict of Nantes.

Soon afterward both sides prepared for a fourth civil war, which began before the end of the year.

=== Death toll ===
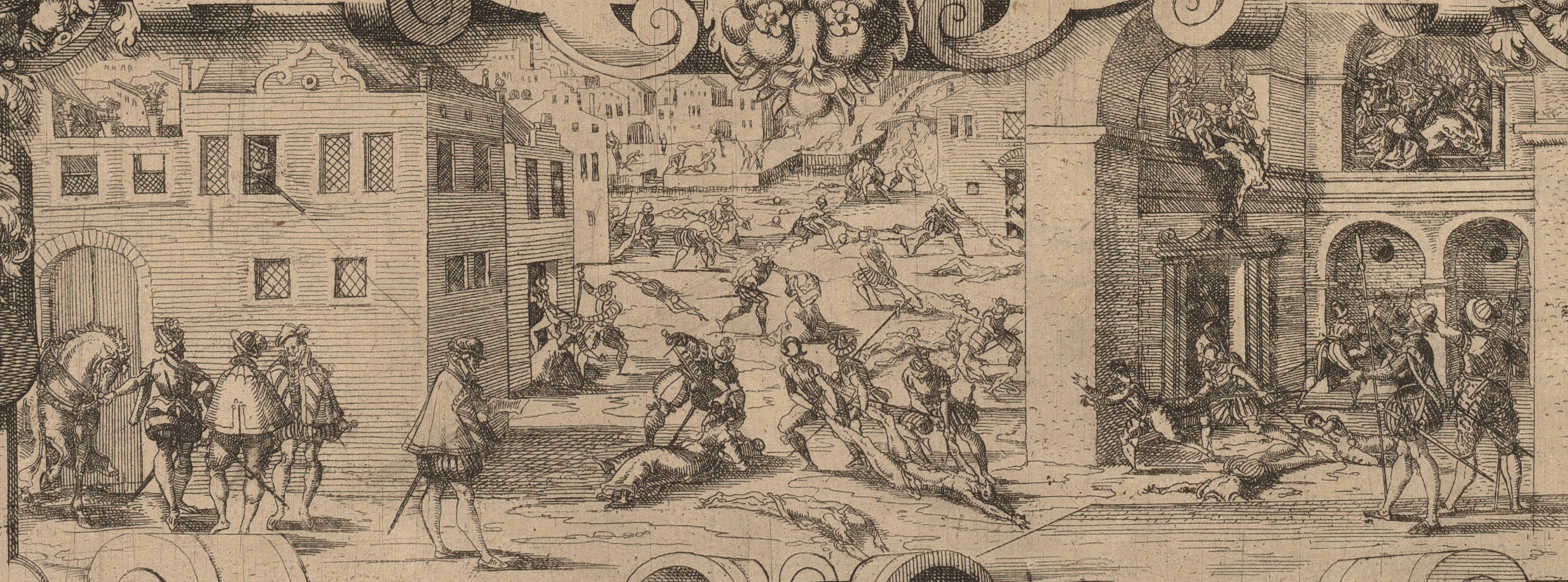
Bas de page detail from a portrait print of Coligny, Jost Amman, 1573. Coligny is shot at left, and killed at right.

Estimates of the number that perished in the massacres have varied from 2,000 by a Roman Catholic apologist to 70,000 by the contemporary Huguenot Maximilien de Béthune, who himself barely escaped death. Accurate figures for casualties have never been compiled, and even in writings by modern historians there is a considerable range, though the more specialised the historian, the lower they tend to be. At the low end are figures of about 2,000 in Paris and 3,000 in the provinces, the latter figure an estimate by Philip Benedict in 1978. Other estimates are about 10,000 in total, with about 3,000 in Paris and 7,000 in the provinces. At the higher end are total figures of up to 20,000, or 30,000 in total, from "a contemporary, non-partisan guesstimate" quoted by the historians Felipe Fernández-Armesto and D. Wilson.

For Paris, the only hard figure is a payment by the city to workmen for collecting and burying 1,100 bodies washed up on the banks of the Seine downstream from the city in one week. Body counts relating to other payments are computed from this.

Among the slain were the philosopher Petrus Ramus, and in Lyon the composer Claude Goudimel. The corpses floating down the Rhône from Lyon are said to have put the people of Arles off drinking the water for three months.

== Reactions ==
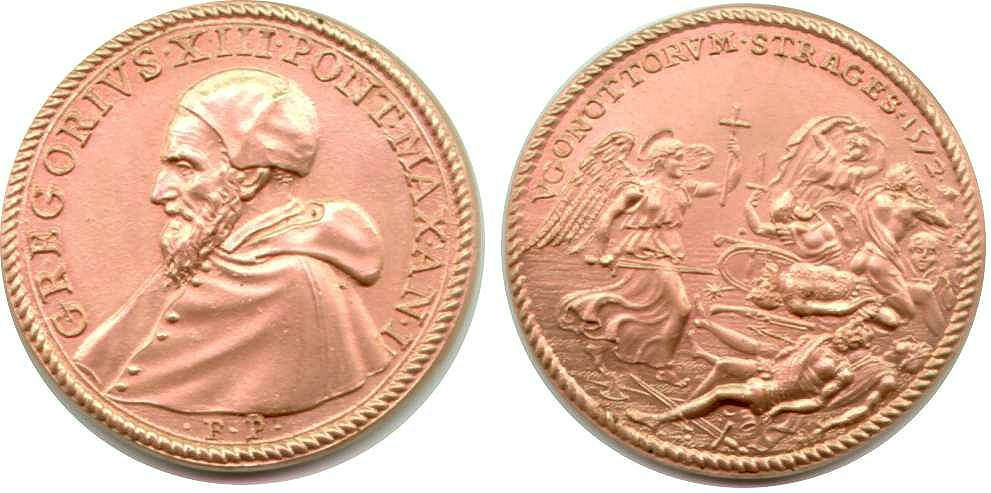
Gregory XIII's medal

The Politiques, those Catholics who placed national unity above sectarian interests, were horrified, but many Catholics inside and outside France initially regarded the massacres as deliverance from an imminent Huguenot coup d'etat. The severed head of Coligny was apparently dispatched to Pope Gregory XIII, though it got no further than Lyon, and the pope sent the king a Golden Rose. The pope ordered a Te Deum to be sung as a special thanksgiving (a practice continued for many years after) and had a medal struck with the motto Ugonottorum strages 1572 (Latin: "Overthrow (or slaughter) of the Huguenots 1572") showing an angel bearing a cross and a sword before which are the felled Protestants.

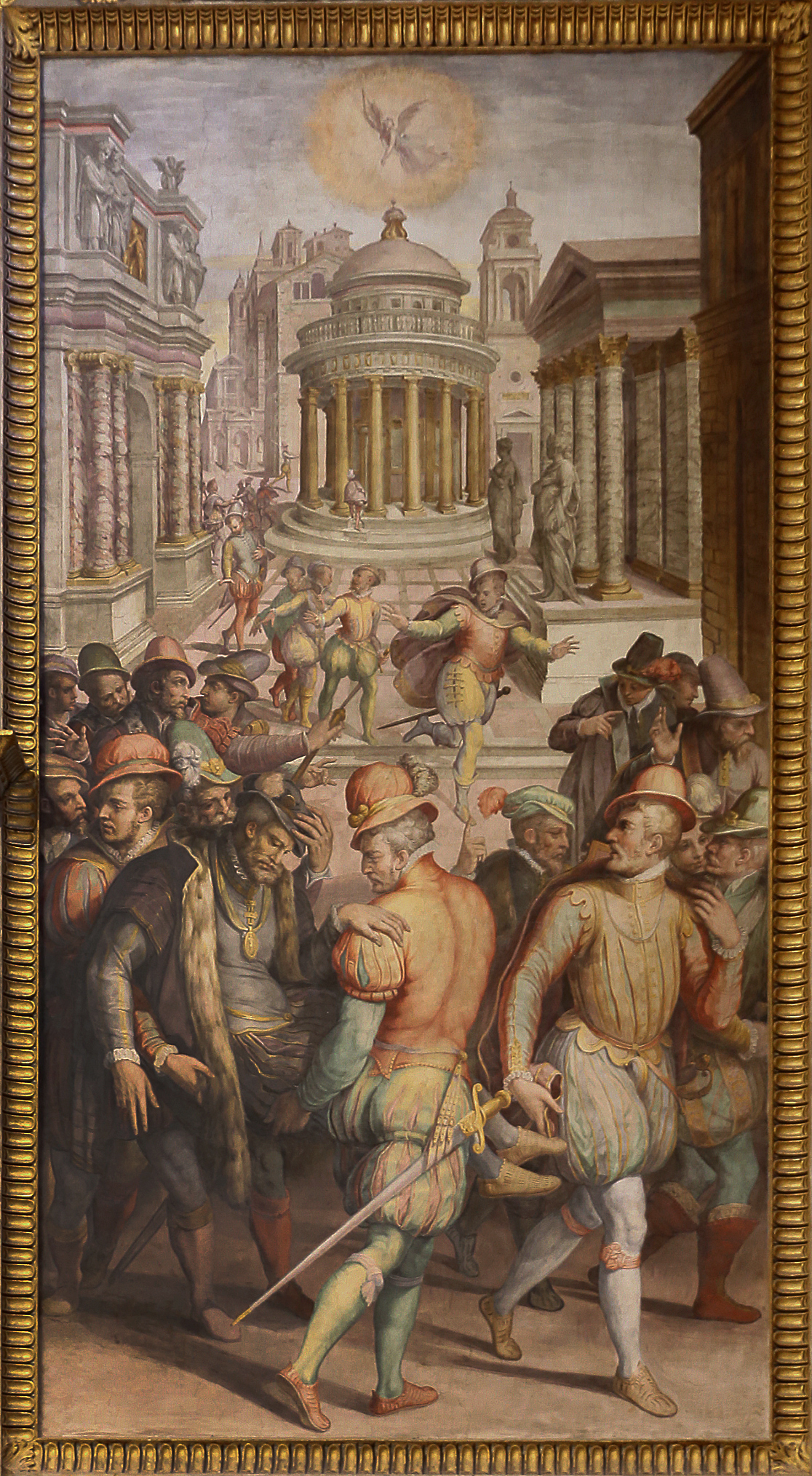
The wounding of Gaspard de Coligny as depicted in a fresco by Giorgio Vasari.

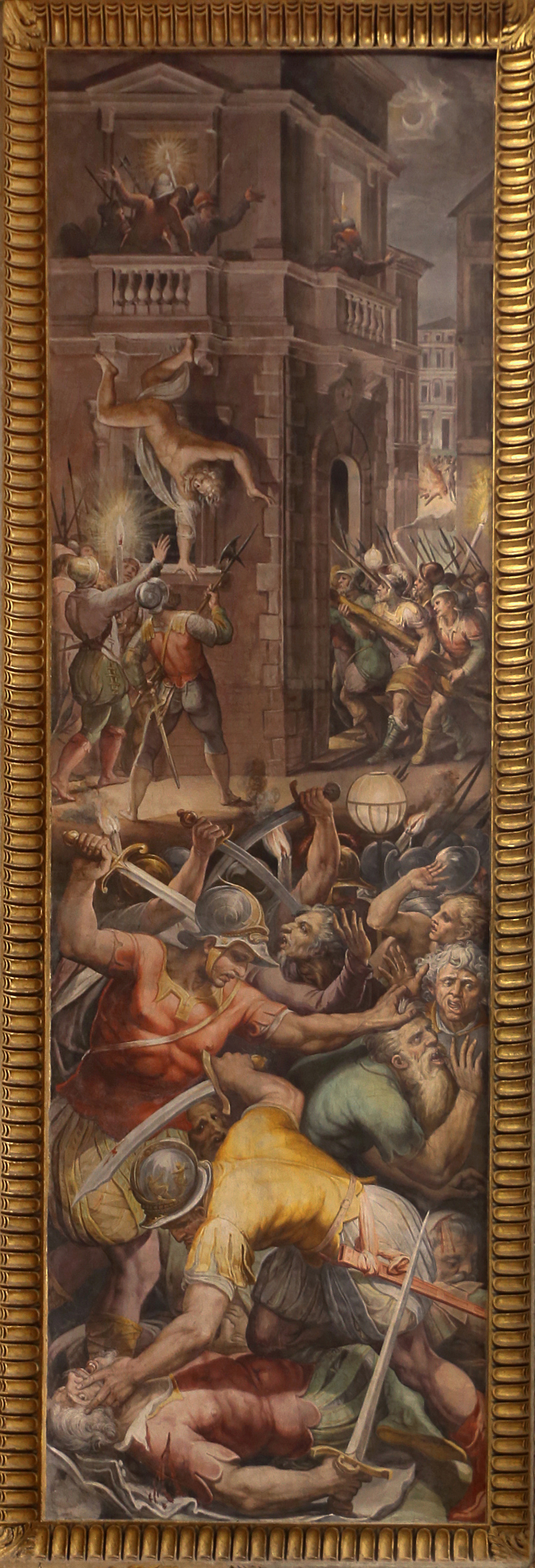
The massacre, with the murder of Gaspard de Coligny above left, as depicted in a fresco by Giorgio Vasari.

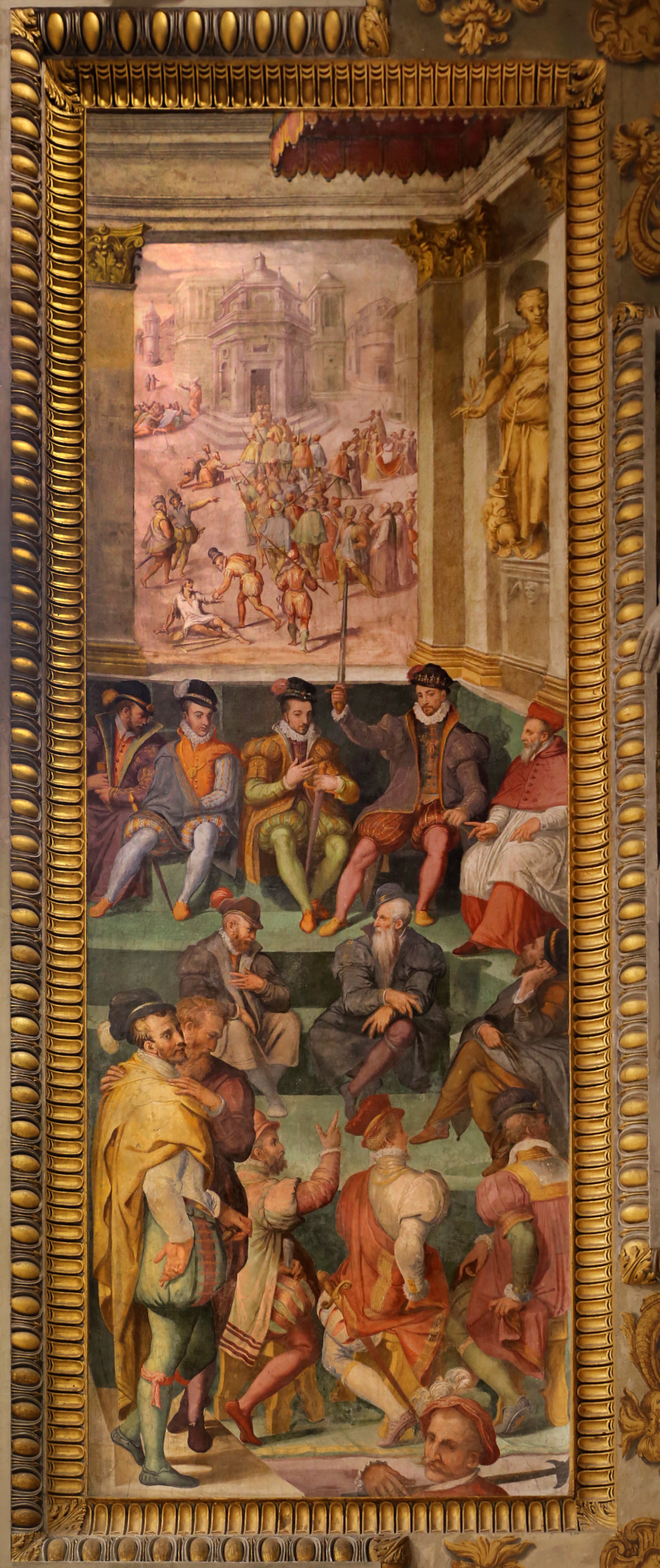
Charles IX in front of the Paris Parlement on 26 August 1572, justifying the Saint Bartholomew massacre as a response to a Huguenot plot. Vasari for Pope Gregory XIII, Sala Regia (Vatican).

Pope Gregory XIII also commissioned the artist Giorgio Vasari to paint three frescos in the Sala Regia depicting the wounding of Coligny, his death, and Charles IX before Parliament, matching those commemorating the defeat of the Turks at the Battle of Lepanto (1571). "The massacre was interpreted as an act of divine retribution; Coligny was considered a threat to Christendom and thus Pope Gregory XIII designated 11 September 1572 as a joint commemoration of the Battle of Lepanto and the massacre of the Huguenots."

Although these formal acts of rejoicing in Rome were not repudiated publicly, misgivings in the papal curia grew as the true story of the killings gradually became known. Pope Gregory XIII himself refused to receive Charles de Maurevert, said to be the killer of Coligny, on the ground that he was a murderer.

On hearing of the slaughter, Philip II of Spain supposedly "laughed, for almost the only time on record". In Paris, the poet Jean-Antoine de Baïf, founder of the Academie de Musique et de Poésie, wrote a sonnet extravagantly praising the killings. On the other hand, the Holy Roman Emperor, Maximilian II, King Charles's father-in-law, was sickened, describing the massacre as a "shameful bloodbath". Moderate French Catholics also began to wonder whether religious uniformity was worth the price of such bloodshed and the ranks of the Politiques began to swell.

The massacre caused a "major international crisis". Protestant countries were horrified at the events, and only the concentrated efforts of Catherine's ambassadors, including a special mission by Gondi, prevented the collapse of her policy of remaining on good terms with them. Elizabeth I of England's ambassador to France at that time, Sir Francis Walsingham, barely escaped with his life. Even Tsar Ivan the Terrible expressed horror at the carnage in a letter to the Emperor.

The massacre "spawned a pullulating mass of polemical literature, bubbling with theories, prejudices and phobias". Many Catholic authors were exultant in their praise of the king for his bold and decisive action (after regretfully abandoning a policy of meeting Huguenot demands as far as he could) against the supposed Huguenot coup, whose details were now fleshed out in officially sponsored works, though the larger mob massacres were somewhat deprecated: "[one] must excuse the people's fury moved by a laudable zeal which is difficult to restrain once it has been stirred up". Huguenot works understandably dwelt on the harrowing details of violence, expounded various conspiracy theories that the royal court had long planned the massacres, and often showed extravagant anti-Italian feelings directed at Catherine, Gondi, and other Italians at court.

Diplomatic correspondence was readier than published polemics to recognise the unplanned and chaotic nature of the events, which also emerged from several accounts in memoirs published over the following years by witnesses to the events at court, including the famous Memoirs of Margaret of Valois, the only eye-witness account of the massacre from a member of the royal family.

There is also a dramatic and influential account by Henry, duke of Anjou that was not recognised as fake until the 19th century. Anjou's supposed account was the source of the quotation attributed to Charles IX: "Well then, so be it! Kill them! But kill them all! Don't leave a single one alive to reproach me!"

The author of the Lettre de Pierre Charpentier (1572) was not only "a Protestant of sorts, and thus, apparently, writing with inside knowledge", but also "an extreme apologist for the massacre ... in his view ... a well-merited punishment for years of civil disobedience [and] secret sedition..." A strand of Catholic writing, especially by Italian authors, broke from the official French line to applaud the massacre as precisely a brilliant stratagem, deliberately planned from various points beforehand. The most extreme of these writers was Camilo Capilupi, a papal secretary, whose work insisted that the whole series of events since 1570 had been a masterly plan conceived by Charles IX, and carried through by frequently misleading his mother and ministers as to his true intentions. The Venetian government refused to allow the work to be printed there, and it was eventually published in Rome in 1574, and in the same year quickly reprinted in Geneva in the original Italian and a French translation.

It was in this context that the massacre came to be seen as a product of Machiavellianism, a view greatly influenced by the Huguenot Innocent Gentillet, who published his Discours contre Machievel in 1576, which was printed in ten editions in three languages over the next four years. Gentillet held, quite wrongly according to Sydney Anglo, that Machiavelli's "books [were] held most dear and precious by our Italian and Italionized courtiers" (in the words of his first English translation), and so (in Anglo's paraphrase) "at the root of France's present degradation, which has culminated not only in the St Bartholemew massacre but the glee of its perverted admirers". According to Anglo, there is little trace of Machiavelli in French writings before the massacre, and not very much after, until Gentillet's own book, but this concept was seized upon by many contemporaries, which Anglo views played a crucial part in setting the long-lasting popular concept of Machiavellianism. It also gave added impetus to the strong anti-Italian feelings already present in Huguenot polemic. Vickie Sullivan asserts that the responsibility for the assassination of the Protestant leaders "rests directly with Charles IX and his advisors, including his mother" and that "their attack against the nobility clearly constituted a great coup d'état, worthy of Machiavelli", noting that the attack echoed Machiavelli's advice to get rid of enemy noblemen.

Christopher Marlowe was one of many Elizabethan writers who were enthusiastic proponents of these ideas. In the Jew of Malta (1589–90) "Machievel" in person speaks the Prologue, claiming to not be dead, but to have possessed the soul of the Duke of Guise, "And, now the Guise is dead, is come from France/ To view this land, and frolic with his friends" (Prologue, lines 3–4) His last play, The Massacre at Paris (1593) takes the massacre, and the following years, as its subject, with Guise and Catherine both depicted as Machiavellian plotters, bent on evil from the start. The Catholic Encyclopedia of 1913 endorsed a version of this view, describing the massacres as "an entirely political act committed in the name of the immoral principles of Machiavellianism" and blaming "the pagan theories of a certain raison d'état according to which the end justified the means".

The French 18th-century historian Louis-Pierre Anquetil, in his Esprit de la Ligue of 1767, was among the first to begin impartial historical investigation, emphasising the lack of premeditation (before the attempt on Coligny) in the massacre and that Catholic mob violence had a history of uncontrollable escalation. By this period the Massacre was being widely used by Voltaire (in his Henriade) and other Enlightenment writers in polemics against organised religion in general. Lord Acton twice changed his mind on whether the massacre had been premeditated, finally concluding that it had not been. The question of whether the massacre had long been premeditated was not entirely settled until the late 19th century by which time a consensus was reached that it was not.

== Interpretations ==
=== Role of the royal family ===
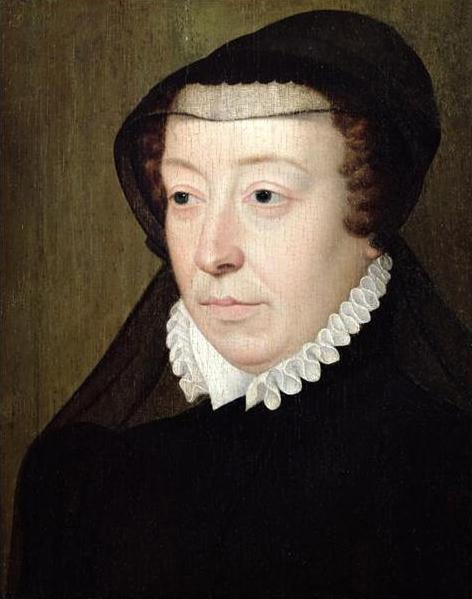
Catherine de' Medici, Charles IX's mother, after François Clouet.

Over the centuries, the St. Bartholomew's Day massacre has aroused a great deal of controversy. Modern historians are still divided over the responsibility of the royal family:

The traditional interpretation makes Catherine de' Medici and her Catholic advisers the principal culprits in the execution of the principal military leaders. They forced the hand of a hesitant and weak-willed king in the decision of that particular execution. This traditional interpretation has been largely abandoned by some modern historians including, among others, Janine Garrisson. However, in a more recent work than his history of the period, Holt concludes: "The ringleaders of the conspiracy appear to have been a group of four men: Henry, duke of Anjou; Chancellor Birague; the duke of Nevers, and the comte de Retz" (Gondi). Apart from Anjou, the others were all Italian advisors at the French court.

According to Denis Crouzet, Charles IX feared a Protestant uprising, and chose to strangle it at birth to protect his power. The execution decision was therefore his own, and not Catherine de' Medici's.

According to Jean-Louis Bourgeon, the violently anti-Huguenot city of Paris was really responsible. He stresses that the city was on the verge of revolt. The Guises, who were highly popular, exploited this situation to put pressure on the King and the Queen Mother. Charles IX was thus forced to head off the potential riot, which was the work of the Guises, the city militia and the common people.

According to Thierry Wanegffelen, the member of the royal family with the most responsibility in this affair is Henry, Duke of Anjou, the king's ambitious younger brother. Following the failed assassination attack against the Admiral de Coligny (which Wanegffelen attributes to the Guise family and Spain), the Italian advisers of Catherine de' Medici undoubtedly recommended in the royal council the execution of about fifty Protestant leaders. These Italians stood to benefit from the occasion by eliminating the Huguenot danger. Despite the firm opposition of the Queen Mother and the King, Anjou, Lieutenant General of the Kingdom, present at this meeting of the council, could see a good occasion to make a name for himself with the government. He contacted the Parisian authorities and another ambitious young man, running out of authority and power, Duke Henri de Guise (whose uncle, the clear-sighted Charles, cardinal of Lorraine, was then detained in Rome).

The Parisian St. Bartholomew's Day massacre resulted from this conjunction of interests, and this offers a much better explanation as to why the men of the Duke of Anjou acted in the name of the Lieutenant General of the Kingdom, consistent with the thinking of the time, rather than in the name of the King. One can also understand why, the day after the start of the massacre, Catherine de' Medici, through royal declaration of Charles IX, condemned the crimes, and threatened the Guise family with royal justice. However, when Charles IX and his mother learned of the involvement of the duke of Anjou, and being so dependent on his support, they issued a second royal declaration, which, while asking for an end to the massacres, credited the initiative with the desire of Charles IX to prevent a Protestant plot. Initially the coup d'état of the duke of Anjou was a success, but Catherine de' Medici went out of her way to deprive him from any power in France: she sent him with the royal army to remain in front of La Rochelle and then had him elected King of the Polish-Lithuanian Commonwealth.

=== Shift in Huguenot thought ===
In the years preceding the massacre, Huguenot political rhetoric had for the first time taken a tone against not just the policies of a particular monarch of France, but monarchy in general. In part this was led by an apparent change in stance by John Calvin in his Readings on the Prophet Daniel, a book of 1561, in which he had argued that when kings disobey God, they "automatically abdicate their worldly power" – a change from his views in earlier works that even ungodly kings should be obeyed. This change was soon picked up by Huguenot writers, who began to expand on Calvin and promote the idea of the sovereignty of the people, ideas to which Catholic writers and preachers responded fiercely.

Nevertheless, it was only in the aftermath of the massacre that anti-monarchical ideas found widespread support from Huguenots, among the "Monarchomachs" and others. "Huguenot writers, who had previously, for the most part, paraded their loyalty to the Crown, now called for the deposition or assassination of a Godless king who had either authorised or permitted the slaughter". Thus, the massacre "marked the beginning of a new form of French Protestantism: one that was openly at war with the crown. This was much more than a war against the policies of the crown, as in the first three civil wars; it was a campaign against the very existence of the Gallican monarchy itself".

=== Role of the religious factions ===
Traditional histories have tended to focus more on the roles of the political notables whose machinations began the massacre than the mindset of those who actually did the killing. Ordinary lay Catholics were involved in the mass killings; they believed they were executing the wishes of the king and of God. At this time, in an age before mass media, "the pulpit remained probably the most effective means of mass communication".

Despite the large numbers of pamphlets and broadsheets in circulation, literacy rates were still poor. Thus, some modern historians have stressed the critical and incendiary role that militant preachers played in shaping ordinary lay beliefs, both Catholic and Protestant.

Historian Barbara B. Diefendorf, Professor of History at Boston University, wrote that Simon Vigor had "said if the King ordered the Admiral (Coligny) killed, 'it would be wicked not to kill him'. With these words, the most popular preacher in Paris legitimised in advance the events of St. Bartholomew's Day". Diefendorf says that when the head of the murdered Coligny was shown to the Paris mob by a member of the nobility, with the claim that it was the King's will, the die was cast. Another historian Mack P. Holt, Professor at George Mason University, agrees that Vigor, "the best known preacher in Paris", preached sermons that were full of references to the evils that would befall the capital should the Protestants seize control. This view is also partly supported by Cunningham and Grell (2000) who explained that "militant sermons by priests such as Simon Vigor served to raise the religious and eschatological temperature on the eve of the Massacre".

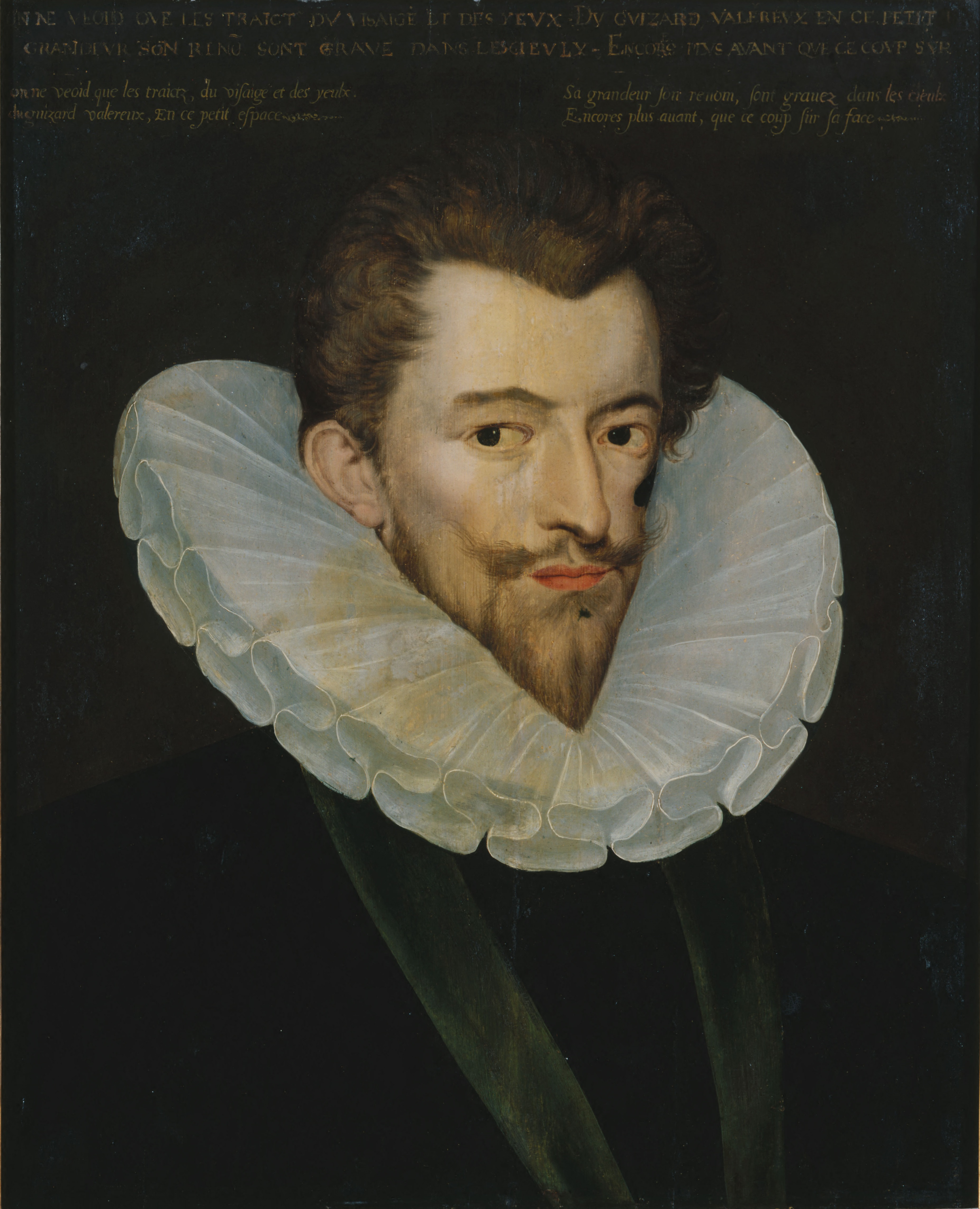
Henry, Duke of Guise, leader of the Catholic League.

Historians cite the extreme tension and bitterness that led to the powder-keg atmosphere of Paris in August 1572. In the previous ten years there had already been three outbreaks of civil war, and attempts by Protestant nobles to seize power in France. Some blame the complete esteem with which the sovereign's office was held, justified by prominent French Roman Catholic theologians, and that the special powers of French Kings "...were accompanied by explicit responsibilities, the foremost of which was combating heresy".

Holt, notable for re-emphasising the importance of religious issues, as opposed to political/dynastic power struggles or socio-economic tensions, in explaining the French Wars of Religion, also re-emphasised the role of religion in the St Bartholomew's Day massacre. He noted that the extra violence inflicted on many of the corpses "was not random at all, but patterned after the rites of the Catholic culture that had given birth to it". "Many Protestant houses were burned, invoking the traditional purification by fire of all heretics. Many victims were also thrown into the Seine, invoking the purification by water of Catholic baptism". Viewed as a threat to the social and political order, Holt argues that "Huguenots not only had to be exterminated – that is, killed – they also had to be humiliated, dishonoured, and shamed as the inhuman beasts they were perceived to be."

However Raymond Mentzer points out that Protestants "could be as bloodthirsty as Catholics. Earlier Huguenot rage at Nimes (in 1567) led to... the massacre of twenty-four Catholics, mostly priests and prominent laymen, at the hands of their Protestant neighbours. Few towns escaped the episodic violence and some suffered repeatedly from both sides. Neither faith had a monopoly on cruelty and misguided fervour".

Some, like Leonie Frieda, emphasise the element within the mob violence of the "haves" being "killed by the 'have-nots'". Many Protestants were nobles or bourgeois and Frieda adds that "a number of bourgeois Catholic Parisians had suffered the same fate as the Protestants; many financial debts were wiped clean with the death of creditors and moneylenders that night". At least one Huguenot was able to buy off his would-be murderers.

The historian H.G. Koenigsberger (who until his retirement in 1984 was Professor of History at King's College, University of London) wrote that the Massacre was deeply disturbing because "it was Christians massacring other Christians who were not foreign enemies but their neighbours with which they and their forebears had lived in a Christian community, and under the same ruler, for a thousand years". He concludes that the historical importance of the Massacre "lies not so much in the appalling tragedies involved as their demonstration of the power of sectarian passion to break down the barriers of civilisation, community and accepted morality".

One historian puts forward an analysis of the massacre in terms of social anthropology – the religious historian Bruce Lincoln. He describes how the religious divide, which gave the Huguenots different patterns of dress, eating and pastimes, as well as the obvious differences of religion and (very often) class, had become a social schism or cleavage. The rituals around the royal marriage had only intensified this cleavage, contrary to its intentions, and the "sentiments of estrangement – radical otherness – [had come] to prevail over sentiments of affinity between Catholics and Protestants".

On 23 August 1997, Pope John Paul II, who was in Paris for the 12th World Youth Day, issued a statement on the Massacre. He stayed in Paris for three days and made eleven speeches. According to Reuters and the Associated Press, at a late-night vigil, with the hundreds of thousands of young people who were in Paris for the celebrations, he made the following comments: "On the eve of Aug. 24, we cannot forget the sad massacre of St. Bartholomew's Day, an event of very obscure causes in the political and religious history of France. ... Christians did things which the Gospel condemns. I am convinced that only forgiveness, offered and received, leads little by little to a fruitful dialogue, which will in turn ensure a fully Christian reconciliation. ... Belonging to different religious traditions must not constitute today a source of opposition and tension. On the contrary, our common love for Christ impels us to seek tirelessly the path of full unity."

== Cultural references ==
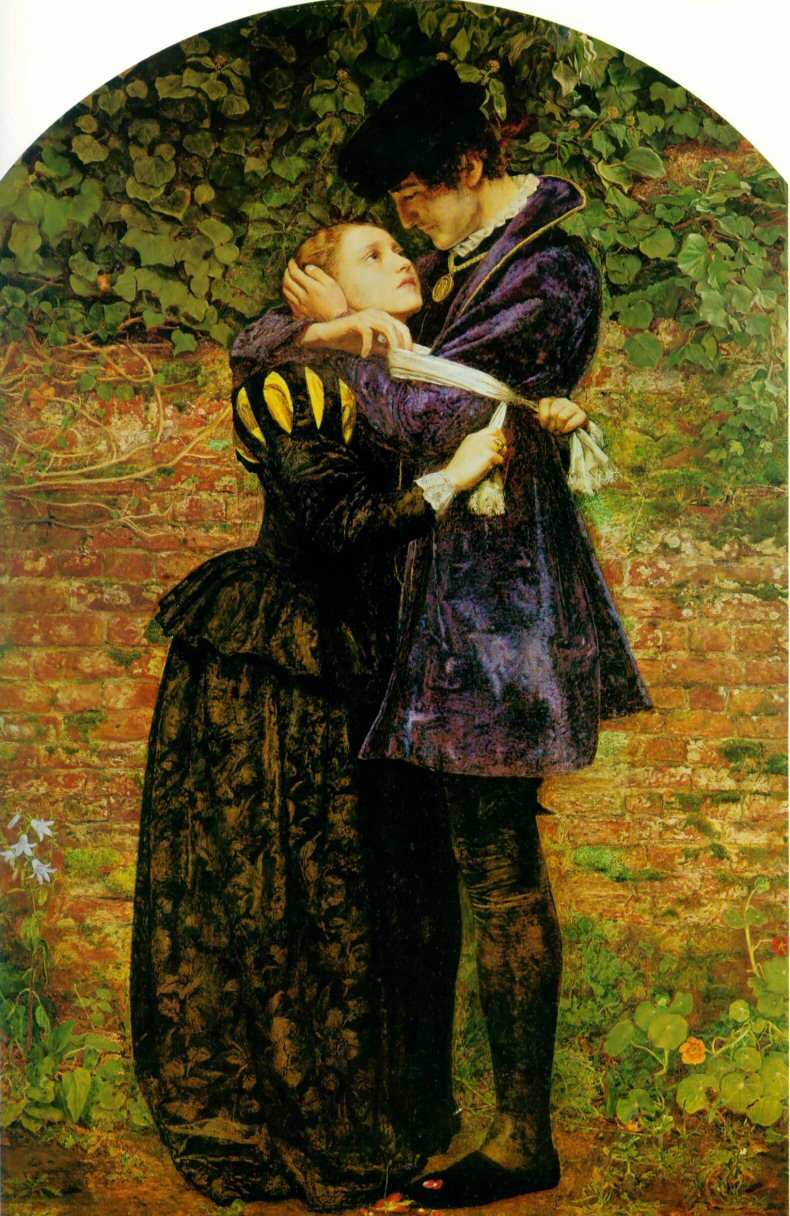
John Everett Millais's painting, A Huguenot, on St. Bartholomew's Day

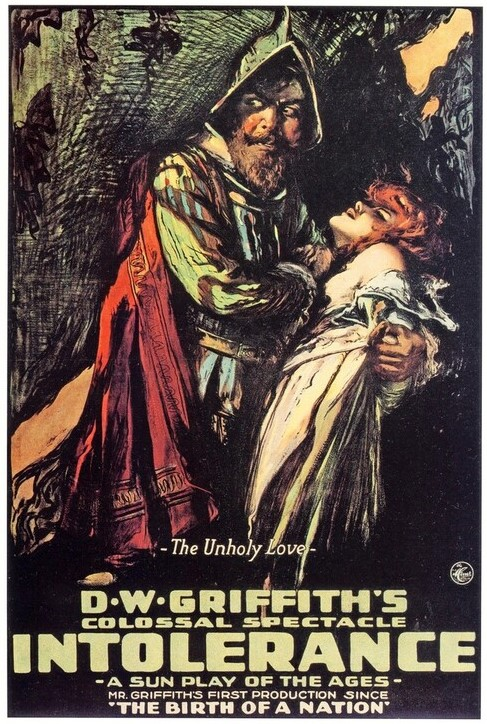
Depiction of the massacre on a poster for the film Intolerance (1916)

The Elizabethan dramatist Christopher Marlowe knew the story well from the Huguenot literature translated into English, and probably from French refugees who had sought refuge in his native Canterbury. He wrote a strongly anti-Catholic and anti-French play based on the events entitled The Massacre at Paris. Also, in his biography The World of Christopher Marlowe, David Riggs claims the incident remained with the playwright, and massacres are incorporated into the final acts of three of his early plays, 1 and 2 Tamburlaine and The Jew of Malta – see above for Marlowe and Machiavellism.

The story was also taken up in 1772 by Louis-Sébastien Mercier in his play Jean Hennuyer, Bishop of Lizieux, unperformed until the French Revolution. This play was translated into English, with some adaptations, as The Massacre by the actress and playwright Elizabeth Inchbald in 1792. Inchbald kept the historical setting, but The Massacre, completed by February 1792, also reflected events in the recent French Revolution, though not the September Massacres of 1792, which coincided with its printing.

Joseph Chénier's play Charles IX was a huge success during the French Revolution, drawing strongly anti-monarchical and anti-religious lessons from the massacre. Chénier was able to put his principles into practice as a politician, voting for the execution of Louis XVI and many others, perhaps including his brother André Chénier. However, before the collapse of the Revolution he became suspected of moderation, and in some danger himself.

The story was fictionalised by Prosper Mérimée in his A Chronicle of the Reign of Charles IX (1829), and by Alexandre Dumas, père in La Reine Margot, an 1845 novel that fills in the history as it was then seen with romance and adventure. That novel has been translated into English and was made first into a commercially successful French film in 1954, La reine Margot (US title "A Woman of Evil"), starring Jeanne Moreau. It was remade in 1994 as La Reine Margot (later as Queen Margot, and subtitled, in English-language markets), starring Isabelle Adjani.

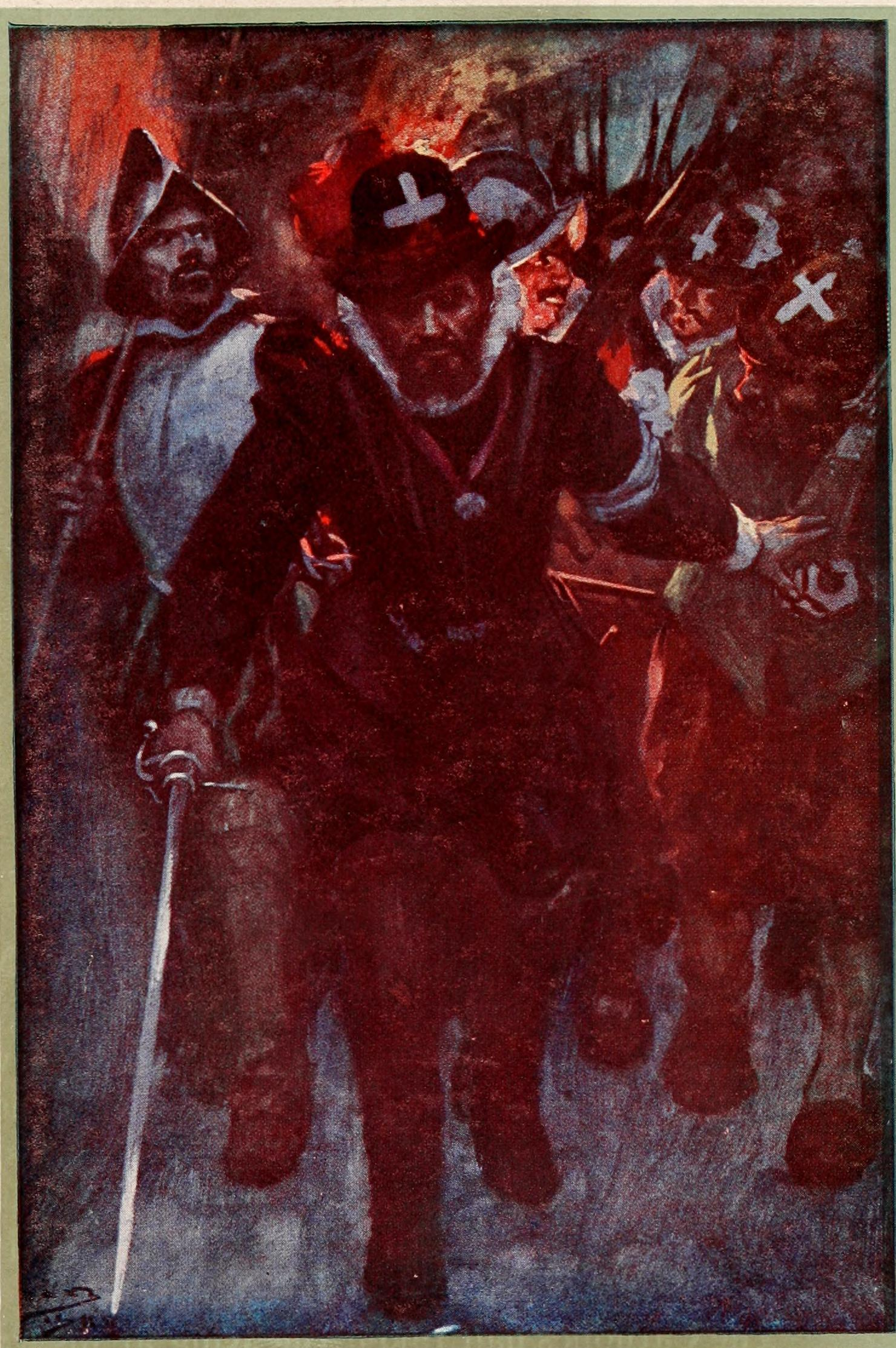
"They seemed but dark shadows as they slid along the walls", illustration from an English History of France, c. 1912

Giacomo Meyerbeer's opera Les Huguenots (1836), very loosely based on the events of the massacre, was one of the most popular and spectacular examples of French grand opera.

The Pre-Raphaelite painter John Everett Millais managed to create a sentimental moment in the massacre in his painting A Huguenot, on St. Bartholomew's Day (1852), which depicts a Catholic woman attempting to convince her Huguenot lover to wear the white scarf badge of the Catholics and protect himself. The man, true to his beliefs, gently refuses her. Millais was inspired to create the painting after seeing Meyerbeer's Les Huguenots.

Mark Twain described the massacre in "From the Manuscript of 'A Tramp Abroad' (1879): The French and the Comanches", an essay about "partly civilized races". He wrote in part, "St. Bartholomew's was unquestionably the finest thing of the kind ever devised and accomplished in the world. All the best people took a hand in it, the King and the Queen Mother included."

The St. Bartholomew's Day massacre and the events surrounding it were incorporated into D.W. Griffith's film Intolerance (1916). The film follows Catherine de' Medici (Josephine Crowell) plotting the massacre, coercing her son King Charles IX (Frank Bennett) to sanction it. Incidental characters include Henri of Navarre, Marguerite de Valois (Constance Talmadge), Admiral Coligny (Joseph Henabery), and the Duke of Anjou, who is portrayed as homosexual. These historic scenes are depicted alongside a fictional plot in which a Huguenot family is caught among the events.

Another novel depicting this massacre is Queen Jezebel, by Jean Plaidy (1953). In the third episode of the BBC miniseries Elizabeth R (1971), starring Glenda Jackson as Queen Elizabeth I of England, the English court's reaction to the massacre and its effect on England's relations with France is addressed in depth.

A 1966 serial in the British science fiction television series Doctor Who entitled The Massacre of St Bartholomew's Eve is set during the events leading up to the Paris massacre. Leonard Sachs appeared as Admiral Coligny and Joan Young played Catherine de' Medici. This serial is missing from the BBC archives and survives only in audio form. It depicts the massacre as having been instigated by Catherine de' Medici for both religious and political reasons, and authorised by a weak-willed and easily influenced Charles IX.

The St Bartholomew's Day massacre is the setting for Tim Willocks' historical novel, The Twelve Children of Paris (Matthias Tannhauser Trilogy:2), published in 2013.

Ken Follett's 2017 historical fiction novel A Column of Fire uses this event. Several chapters depict in great detail the massacre and the events leading up to it, with the book's protagonists getting some warning in advance and making enormous but futile efforts to avert it. Follett completely clears King Charles IX and his mother Catherine of any complicity and depicts them as sincere proponents of religious toleration, caught by surprise and horrified by the events; he places the entire responsibility on the Guise Family, following the "Machiavellian" view of the massacre and depicting it as a complicated Guise conspiracy, meticulously planned in advance and implemented in full detail.

The second season finale of The Serpent Queen depicts the St. Bartholomew's massacre.

== See also ==
- List of incidents of cannibalism
- Michelade, a massacre of Catholics by Protestants in Nîmes in 1567
- Sack of Magdeburg in 1631
- Grenoble's Saint-Bartholomew's Day, a massacre during World War II that was named after the St. Bartholomew's Day massacre
