= Henriade =

1723 epic poem by Voltaire

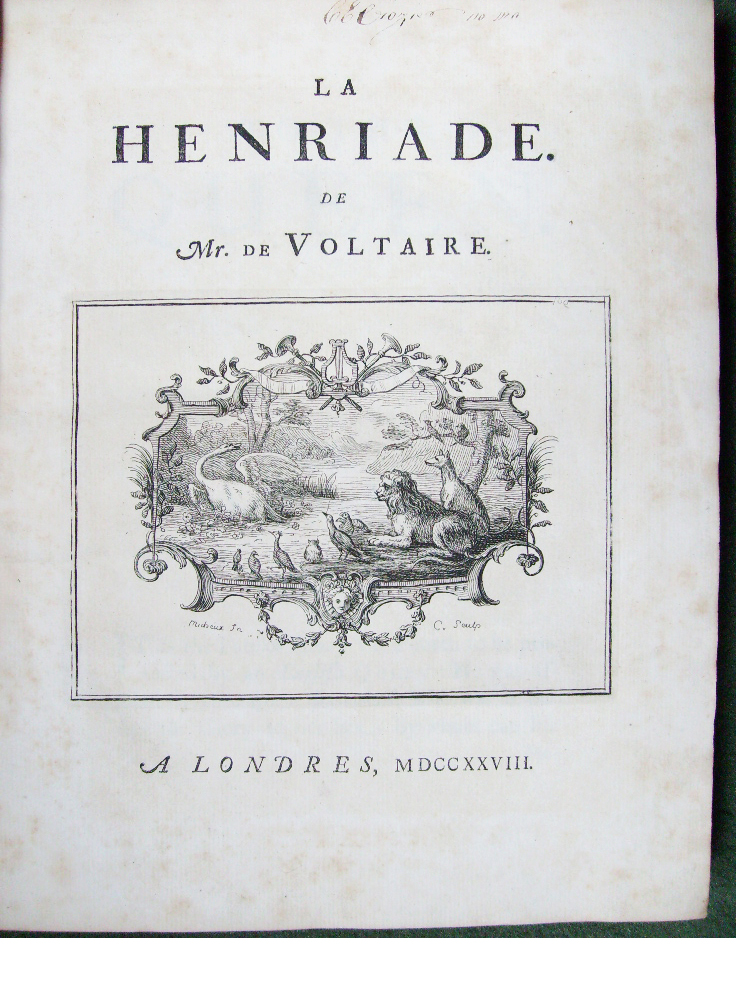
- Cover of La Henriade
- Author: Voltaire
- Original title: La Henriade
- Language: French
- Genre: Epic poem
- Publication date: 1723
- Publication place: Kingdom of France

La Henriade (French pronunciation: [la ɑ̃ʁjad]) is an epic poem of 1723 written by the French Enlightenment writer and philosopher Voltaire. According to Voltaire himself, the poem concerns and was written in honour of the life of Henry IV of France, and is a celebration of his life. The ostensible subject is the siege of Paris in 1589 by Henry III in concert with Henry of Navarre, soon to be Henry IV, but its themes are the twin evils of religious fanaticism and civil discord. It also concerns the political state of France. Voltaire aimed to be the French Virgil, outdoing the master by preserving Aristotelian unity of place—a property of classical tragedy rather than epic—by keeping the human action confined between Paris and Ivry. It was first printed (under the title La Ligue) in 1723, and reprinted dozens of times within Voltaire's lifetime.

== Structure ==
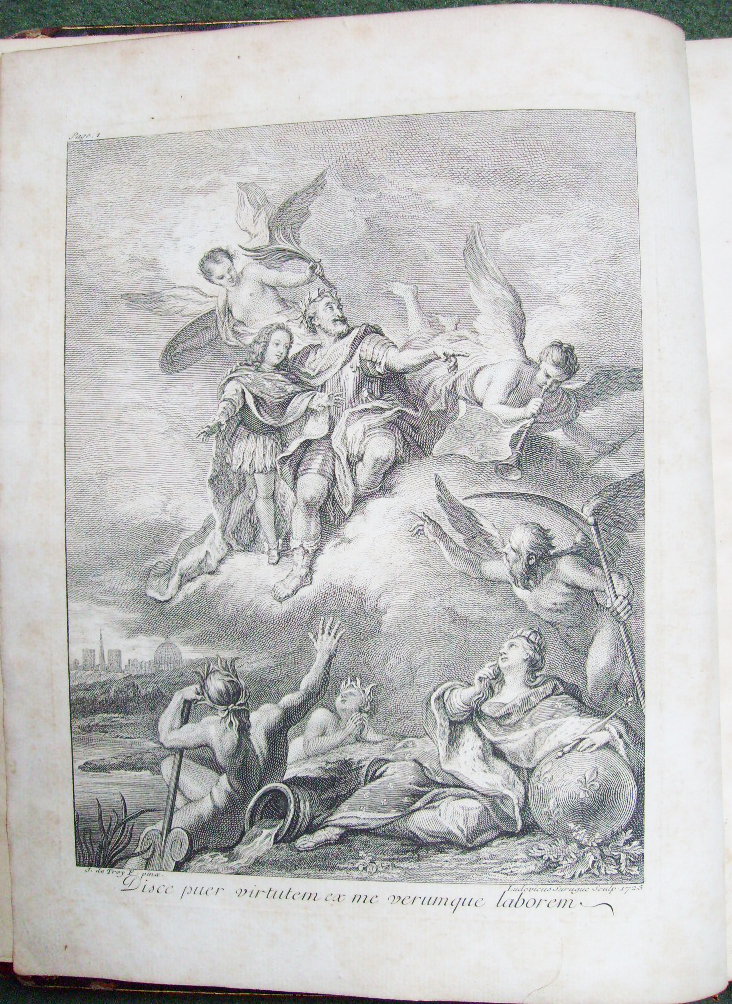
An edition of the Henriade was illustrated by Jean-Michel Moreau.

The poem, in ten chants or cantos, comprises two major parts; the first is strictly from an historical point of view, and its material is only factual. The second part is looser in its factual integrity, and draws more strongly from Voltaire's imagination. These "fictions", as Voltaire calls them, mostly relate to Henry IV, and "draw from the regions of the marvelous", and include "the prediction of Henry's conversion, of the protection given to him by Saint Louis, his apparition, the fire from Heaven destroying those magical performances which were then so common, etc." Voltaire also stated that various other sections of the poem were purely allegorical: "for example, the voyage of Discord to Rome, Politics and Fanaticism personified, the temple of Love, the Passions and Vices, etc."

The poem was written in a reformed styling of the twelve-syllable alexandrine couplet. He made this stylised hexameter for dramatic effect. Some commentators remarked that this particular rhythm of verse was unsuited to the content and theme of the poem. According to the poem's editor O. R. Taylor, the poem "rarely touches the sensibility of the modern reader" and readers hoping for sublime fire will be disappointed, though Voltaire's verse is always idiomatic and never pedestrian. Voltaire's English Essay upon the Civil Wars in France. Extracted from Curious Manuscripts (1727) expresses his Enlightened opinions on these themes in a prose form that is more approachable to modern taste.

O. R. Taylor's critical edition of La Henriade devotes a full volume to an introduction, accounting for the germination of the idea and its publication history, the contextual theory of the epic and sources both literary and in recent history and contemporary events, and the nineteenth-century decline in the poem's popularity. Taylor reprints eighteenth-century prefaces to the poem, which always carried critical apparatus in the form of Voltaire's own notes.

== Reception ==
Henriade is one of two epic poems by Voltaire, the other being La Pucelle d'Orléans, which took Joan of Arc as a subject of satire. Voltaire wrote other poems during his life, but none were nearly as lengthy or detailed as these two. While Henriade was viewed as a great poem, and as one of Voltaire's best, many did not believe it to be his masterpiece, or the best he was capable of; many claimed it lacked originality or novel inspiration, and that it was nothing truly extraordinary. Some remarked that this low standard of quality came of Voltaire's non-comprehension of what he was writing, and his lack of enthusiasm in the poem's writing.

François-Thomas-Marie de Baculard d'Arnaud's 1740 tragedy Coligny was strongly influenced by Voltaire's work. Both later provided inspiration for the 1787 history painting Admiral Coligny Confronts His Assassins by Joseph-Benoît Suvée.

== Editions ==
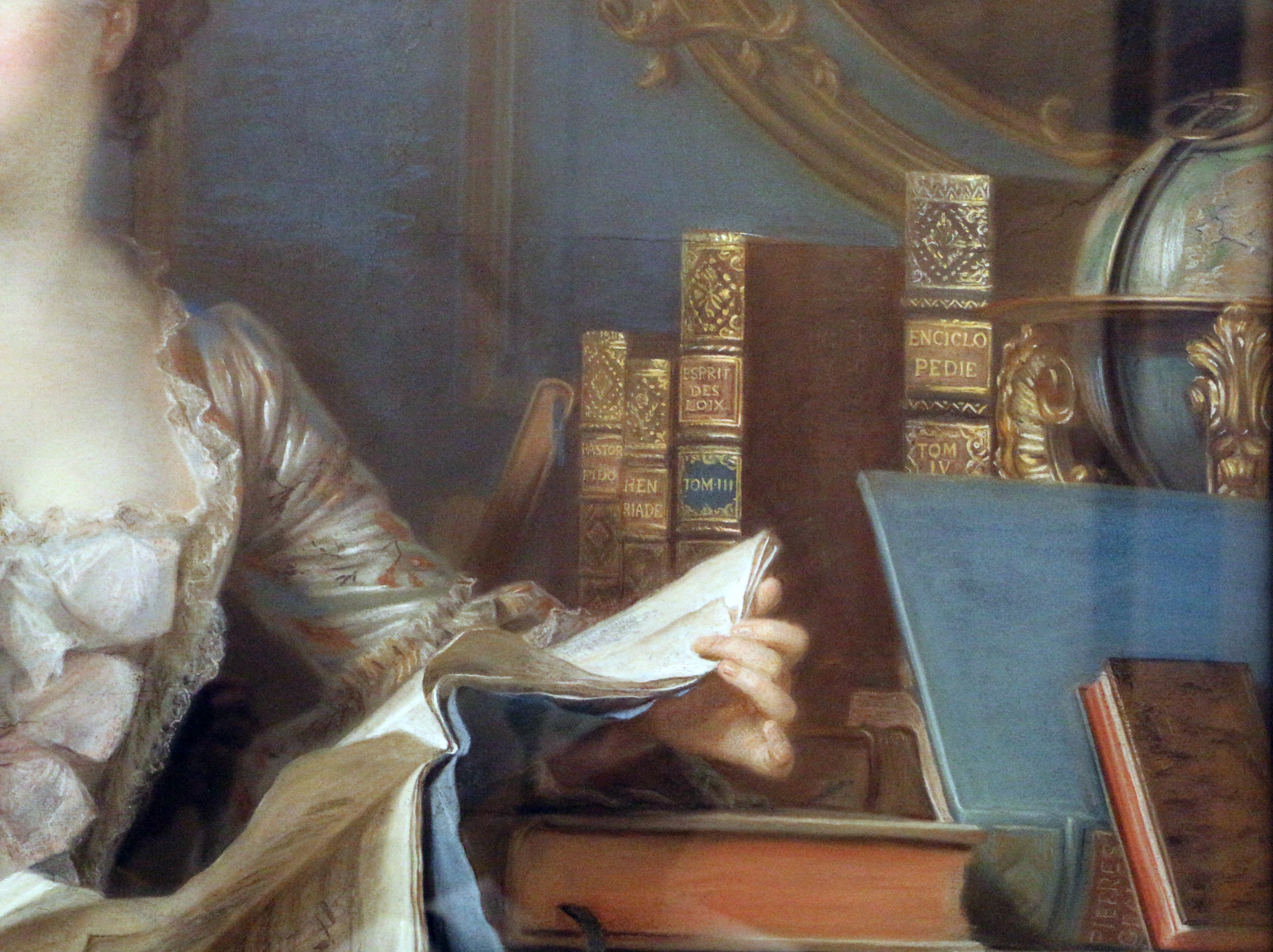
Portrait of Madame de Pompadour, detail including a Henriade edition

- La Henriade, Poeme par Voltaire (in French), Freres Perisse, 1807
- The Henriade, an epic poem, Burton and Co., translated
