= Giacinto Marras =

Italian opera singer (1810–1883)

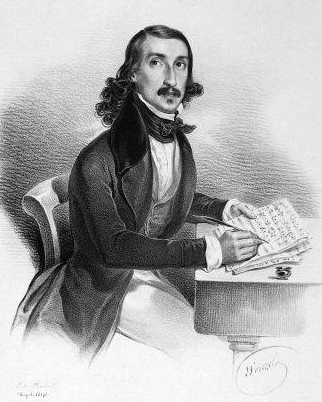
Giacinto Marras

Giacinto Marras (1810 at Naples – 1883) was an Italian singer and musical composer.

He studied music in Naples; came to England, 1835; sang at, and gave, concerts with Giulia Grisi, Luigi Lablache, Michael William Balfe, and others; visited Russia, 1842, and Vienna and Naples later; was in Paris, 1844; settled in England, 1846; published songs and other works; sang in public; Institut d'après-midis musicales at his own house; visited India, 1870–3, and the Riviera, 1879; immense repertoire of oratorio, opera, and chamber music; as composer belongs to Italian school; published also Lezioni di Canto and Elementi Vocali 1850, valuable treatises on singing.
