= Bernard-Claude Savy =

French physician, publisher and politician

- Born: September 1, 1922; Neuilly-sur-Seine, Hauts-de-Seine, France
- Died: May 28, 1997 (aged 74); Courbevoie, Hauts-de-Seine, France
- Occupations: Physician, publisher, politician

Bernard-Claude Savy (1922–1997) was a French physician, publisher and politician.

== Early life ==
Bernard-Claude Savy was born on September 1, 1922, in Neuilly-sur-Seine, near Paris.

== Career ==
Savy was a physician who also wrote several books about economic freedom. He joined the Rally for the Republic, a center-right political party. He founded Clubs Avenir et Liberté, a center-right political organization, in 1981. The organization held meetings with center-right politicians like Alain Madelin, Charles Pasqua and Alain Juppé, and Jean-Marie Le Pen, the leading of the National Front.

Meanwhile, Savy served as a member of the National Assembly from 1986 to 1988, representing Nièvre. He admitted that he preferred winning with the support of the National Front than losing without it, adding both parties shared similar views.

Savy founded Réformes et Liberté, a political organization headquartered in Paris, in 1994. He served as the Deputy Mayor of Asnières-sur-Seine in 1995. A year later, in 1996, he served as the Secretary General of Environnement et Santé, a non-profit organization which published Profils médico-sociaux and a supplement entitled Environnement et Santé. The journal published articles which praised the Church of Scientology.

== Death ==
He died of cancer on May 28, 1997, in Courbevoie, near Paris.

== Bibliography ==
- La Santé, un combat politique (Asnières-sur-Seine: Editions de l'Avenir, 1972, 240 pages).
- Profils des temps présents avec 24 idées pour l'avenir (Asnières-sur-Seine: Editions de l'Avenir, 1983, 205 pages).
- La Liberté demain (Paris: Albatros, 1985, 190 pages).
- Le Prix de la liberté (Paris: Albatros, 1985, 125 pages).
