= Robert L. Dawson =

- Born: July 26, 1943; Buenos Aires, Argentina
- Died: June 5, 2007 (aged 63); Paris, France
- Occupations: University Professor; Book collector
- Employer: University of Texas at Austin

Robert L. Dawson (1943-2007) was a professor of French language and literature in the Department of French and Italian at the University of Texas at Austin.

== Biography ==
=== Early life ===
Robert L. Dawson was born on July 26, 1943, in Buenos Aires, Argentina.

=== Career ===
In 1975, he started teaching French at the University of Texas at Austin. His fields of interest were eighteenth-century French literature and culture, the history of the book, and descriptive bibliography.

His collection of 18th century manuscripts and printed works is held in Texas by the Texas A&M University's Cushing Library.

=== Death ===
He died on June 5, 2007, in Paris, France.

== Selected publications ==
- Confiscations at Customs: Banned Books and the French Booktrade during the Last Years of the Ancien régime. Voltaire Foundation. 2006.
- The French Booktrade and the "permission simple" of 1777 : copyright and public domain with an edition of the permit registers. Voltaire Foundation. 1992.
- Additions to the bibliographies of the French prose fiction, 1618-1806. Voltaire Foundation. 1985.
- Baculard d'Arnaud: Life and Prose Fiction. 2 Vols. Studies on Voltaire and the Eighteenth Century, 141-42. Voltaire Foundation. 1976.
