= Shankarrao Salvi =

Indian kabaddi player (1931–2007)

- Born: 15 July 1931
- Died: 15 February 2007 (aged 75); Mumbai, Maharashtra, India
- Other name: Buwa Salvi
- Occupation: Kabaddi player

Shankarrao Salvi (15 July 1931 – 15 February 2007) was an Indian Kabaddi player, coach and administrator. He was life president of Amateur Kabaddi Federation of India.

Salvi is described as a persuasive speaker. His efforts in the field resulted in the merging of "hu tu tu" into a standardised version of kabaddi. Hu tu tu, a traditional game similar to kabaddi, played in Maharashtra has nine players per side whereas the standard kabaddi is played with seven players per side. Traditionalists in Maharashtra had resisted replacement of the word "hu tu tu" with "kabaddi" a word more common in northern India. They had persisted in their resistance even after its acceptance in the southern India states.

Salvi was a Royist, who cultivated good relations with the state government and lobbied with chief ministers of Maharashtra, to obtain state patronage for Kabaddi. He didn't abuse his contacts for personal benefits; when asked by the Chief Minister what he wanted, Salvi even though he lived in a rented house, requested for space for an administrative office for kabaddi. Salvi travelled widely to popularise kabaddi. In the 1970s, Salvi organised tours to Bangladesh and Japan. His efforts lead to the popularisation of the sport internationally and its being played in the Asian Games in 1990 where India won the gold medal. He was a member of the working committee of the International Kabaddi Federation when the foundation was created in 2004.

Salvi received the "Shiv Chhatrapati Rajya Krida Jivan Gaurav Puraskar", awarded by the Government of Maharashtra to sportspersons from Maharashtra for lifetime contribution to sports in 2005. He is popularly referred to as "Buwa Salvi" and honorarily as "Kabaddi Maharashi" or the grand old man of Kabaddi. He died on 15 February 2007 at the age of 75 in Mumbai. The 27th Federation Cup Kabaddi Tournament, held in May 2007 in Mumbai and organised by Maharashtra State Kabaddi Association was dedicated to Salvi. His birthday, 15 July, is observed as Kabaddi Din ("Kabaddi Day") in Maharashtra. The venue of the 57th Maharashtra State Kabaddi Championship was named after him as "Late Shankarrao Salvi Krida Nagri".
