= René Debrie =

French linguist (1920–1989)

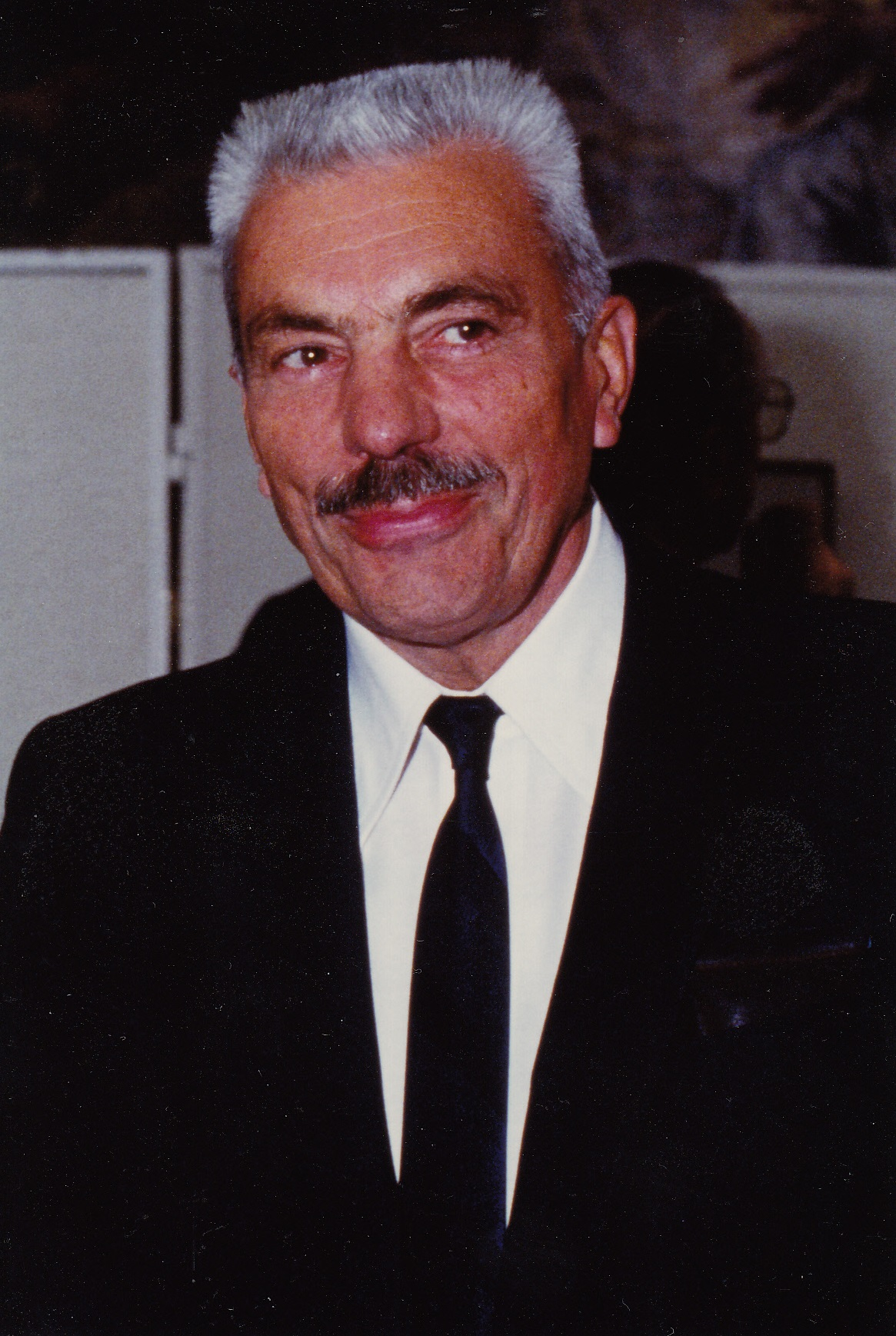
René Debrie (1980)

René Debrie (4 July 1920 – 1 August 1989) was a French linguist. He was born in Warloy-Baillon on 4 July 1920, and died in Amiens on 1 August 1989

== Life ==
Debrie obtained his degree in literature in 1944 and his PhD at the Sorbonne in 1960.

He began his research career in 1950. From the 1960s to the 1980s, he became one of the experts of the dialect of the Picard language, greatly expanding knowledge in that area. He published numerous books and lexicons of dialectology. In 1975, he became an assistant professor at the University of Picardy and was appointed a full professor in 1979.

He encouraged many of his students (including Beauvy Francois and Pierre Ivart) to publish lexicons and dictionaries of regional languages. He was the founder of the Centre d'études picardes (Center for Studies of the Picard Language) of the University of Picardy.

In 1966, he created the cultural association Éklitra with Pierre Garnier and Rene Vaillant.

== Bibliography (selected) ==
- Le Verbe dans les parlers picards de l'Amiénois, Éklitra, Amiens, 2001
- Toponymie d'Albert, Eklitra, Amiens, 1996
- Comm'-y-serre Gueuvernon, Eklitra, Amiens, 1989
- Lexique français-picard élaboré à partir des parlers de l'Amiénois, Bibliothèque municipale d'Amiens, 1989
- Le Secret des mots picards, recherches étymologiques, Université de Picardie, Amiens, 1989
- La Fable dans la littérature picarde, illustrations de Vincent Gaudefroy, Centre d'études picardes, Université de Picardie, Amiens, 1988
- Répertoire de surnoms picards dans la Somme au XIX^{e}, Université de Picardie, Amiens, 1988
- Contribution à un corpus des noms de marques, Centre d'études de la langue des affaires, Amiens 1987
- Hydronymie de la Somme, Université de Picardie, Amiens, 1987
- Bibliographie d'ethnologie picarde, Université de Picardie, Amiens, 1985
- Glossaire du moyen picard, Université de Picardie, Amiens, 1984
- Bibliographie de dialectologie picarde, Université de Picardie, Amiens, 1982
- Jacques Croédur : héros légendaire abbevillois, C.R.D.P., Amiens, 1980
- Un auteur picard mal connu, Joseph Crinon : 1877-1956, Archives départementales de la Somme, Amiens, 1979
- Pratiques agricoles ancestrales dans le pays de Somme : étude dialecto-folklorique, C.R.D.P., Amiens, 1978
- Édouard Paris, un érudit picard émérite (avec Michel Crampon), C.R.D.P., Amiens, 1977
- Un poème gothique : la Romance du sire de Créqui, une énigme littéraire picarde (avec Pierre Garnier), C.R.D.P., Amiens, 1976
- Répertoire des noms de famille de la Somme en 1849, avec René Boyenval et René Vaillant, Éklitra, Amiens, 1972
- Hector Crinon: étude littéraire et lexique de sa langue (avec Pierre Garnier), Éklitra, Amiens, 1970
- Recherches sur les noms de plantes et les noms d'insectes dans les parlers de la région d'Amiens, C.R.D.P., Amiens, 1969
- Corpus des lieux-dits cadastraux de la Somme, C.R.D.P., Amiens, 1964
- Dictionnaire des noms de famille d'Albert, 1178-1952, Archives du Pas-de-Calais, Arras, 1960

Ses lexiques comprennent:

- Lexique picard des parlers nord-amiénois, Sté de dialectologie picarde, 1961, 198 p. et supplément de 96 p, Arras, 1965.
- Lexique picard des parlers ouest-amiénois, Centre d'études picardes, Amiens, 1975, 424 p.
- Lexique picard des parlers sud-amiénois, Éklitra, Amiens, 1979, 252 p.
- Lexique picard des parlers est-amiénois, Centre d'études picardes, Amiens, 1983, 153 p.

=== Works in collaboration ===
René Debrie collaborated on several books, including:

- La Picardie, Ed. d'Organisation, Paris, (1981)
- La Forêt Invisible. Au nord de la littérature française, le picard, anthologie de la littérature d’expression picarde, Jacques Darras (dir), Jacqueline Picoche, René Debrie, Pierre Ivart, éd. des Trois-Cailloux, Amiens, ISBN 2-903082-20-0 (1985)
- Bibliographie des Dictionnaires patois de Wartburg, Keller et Geuljans (partly on the Picard language) (1969)
