= Max Hornfeck =

American ice hockey player and speed skater

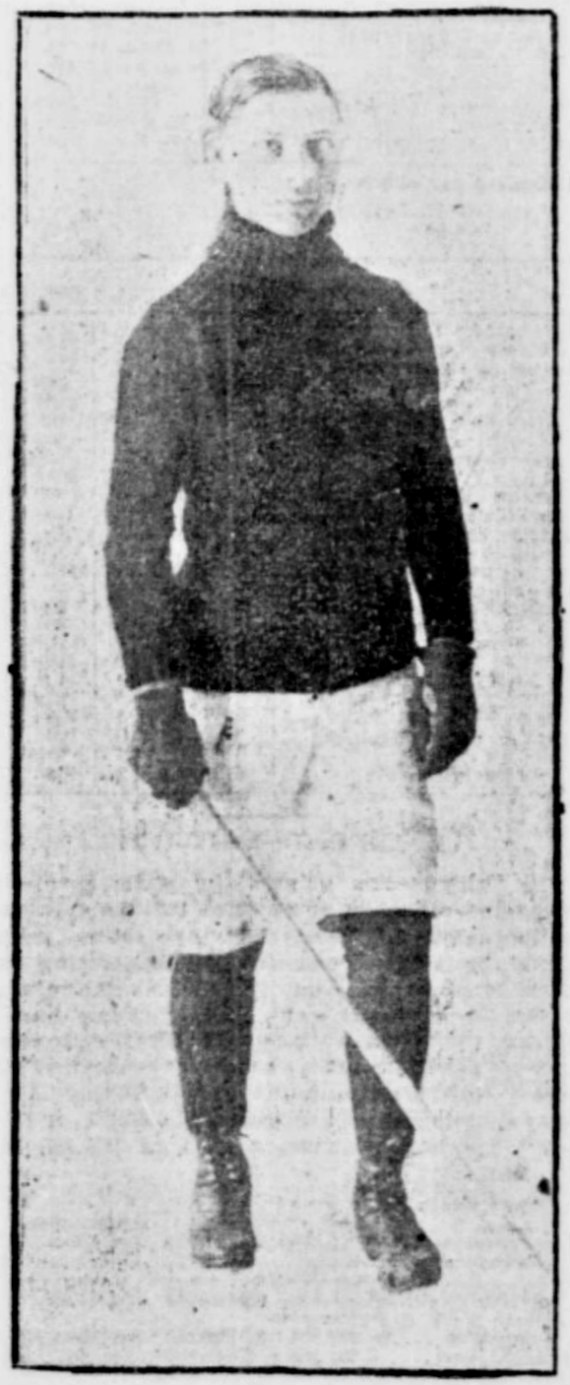
- Max Hornfeck circa 1901.
- Born: January 13, 1874 Verona, New Jersey, USA
- Died: October 25, 1968 (aged 94)
- Height: 5 ft 5 in (165 cm)
- Weight: 124 lb (56 kg; 8 st 12 lb)
- Position: Center
- Shot: Left
- Played for: Montclair Athletic Club; New York Athletic Club; New York Wanderers; New York Hockey Club
- Playing career: 1896–1908

Maximilian Roland Hornfeck (January 13, 1874 – October 25, 1968) was an American amateur ice hockey center and speed skater active in the late 19th and early 20th centuries. Hornfeck played ice hockey for the Montclair Athletic Club, New York Athletic Club, New York Wanderers and New York Hockey Club in the American Amateur Hockey League between 1897 and 1908.

As a speed skater Hornfeck competed both in local and national events against prominent amateur skaters such as LeRoy See (of Berkeley School) and Charles McClave (of the New York Athletic Club).

== Family ==
Max Hornfeck was born in Verona, New Jersey on January 13, 1874, to Hermann Heinrich Hornfeck, a manufacturer, and Anna Kathrine Cimiotti. Hermann Heinrich was born in Gera, Thuringia on February 5, 1839, and immigrated to the United States in 1860. He married Anna Kathrine Cimiotti, a native of Vienna, on February 5, 1866.

== Ice hockey career ==
During the 1896–97 season Max Hornfeck played exhibition games with the Montclair Athletic Club ice hockey team against opponents from New York City and New Jersey, as well as against Queen's University (of Kingston, Ontario) and an All-Baltimore aggregation. His younger brothers Henry (b. 1876) and Gus (b. 1878) were also members of the team. All three of the Hornfeck brothers were of diminutive stature in an ice hockey playing context.

Hornfeck played two seasons with the Montclair AC in the AAHL before he joined the New York Athletic Club for the 1899–1900 season. On the New York Athletic Club forward line he teamed up with newly acquired Canadian right winger Tom Howard, a former Stanley Cup champion with the Winnipeg Victorias (in 1896). Hornfeck played four seasons with the New York AC without being able to win the AAHL championship.

Before the 1903–04 AAHL season Hornfeck, Howard, Charlie Clarke and John Carruthers of the New York AC jumped ship, and along with forward Kenneth "Kay" Gordon and goaltender Harold "Buster" Hayward of the St. Nicholas Hockey Club they formed a new team called the New York Wanderers which took the place of the St. Nicholas HC in the AAHL for the 1903–04 season. The new club was successful at its first try at the championship title as the Wanderers finished at the top of the league table in 1903–04 after having defeated the Brooklyn Crescents 3 goals to 1 on March 4, 1904.

Hornfeck played four more seasons in the AAHL (two with the Wanderers and two with the New York Hockey Club) before he retired at the end of the 1907–08 season.

=== Playing style ===
Max Hornfeck relied much upon his speed to create scoring chances, and he also used his fast feet on the defensive side of the puck breaking up scoring chances for the opponents by overtaking them and lifting their sticks. He did not have a big shot significative of a stand-out goal scorer, but he could nonetheless score a fair number of goals on account of his rushing and dodging abilities.

== Career statistics ==
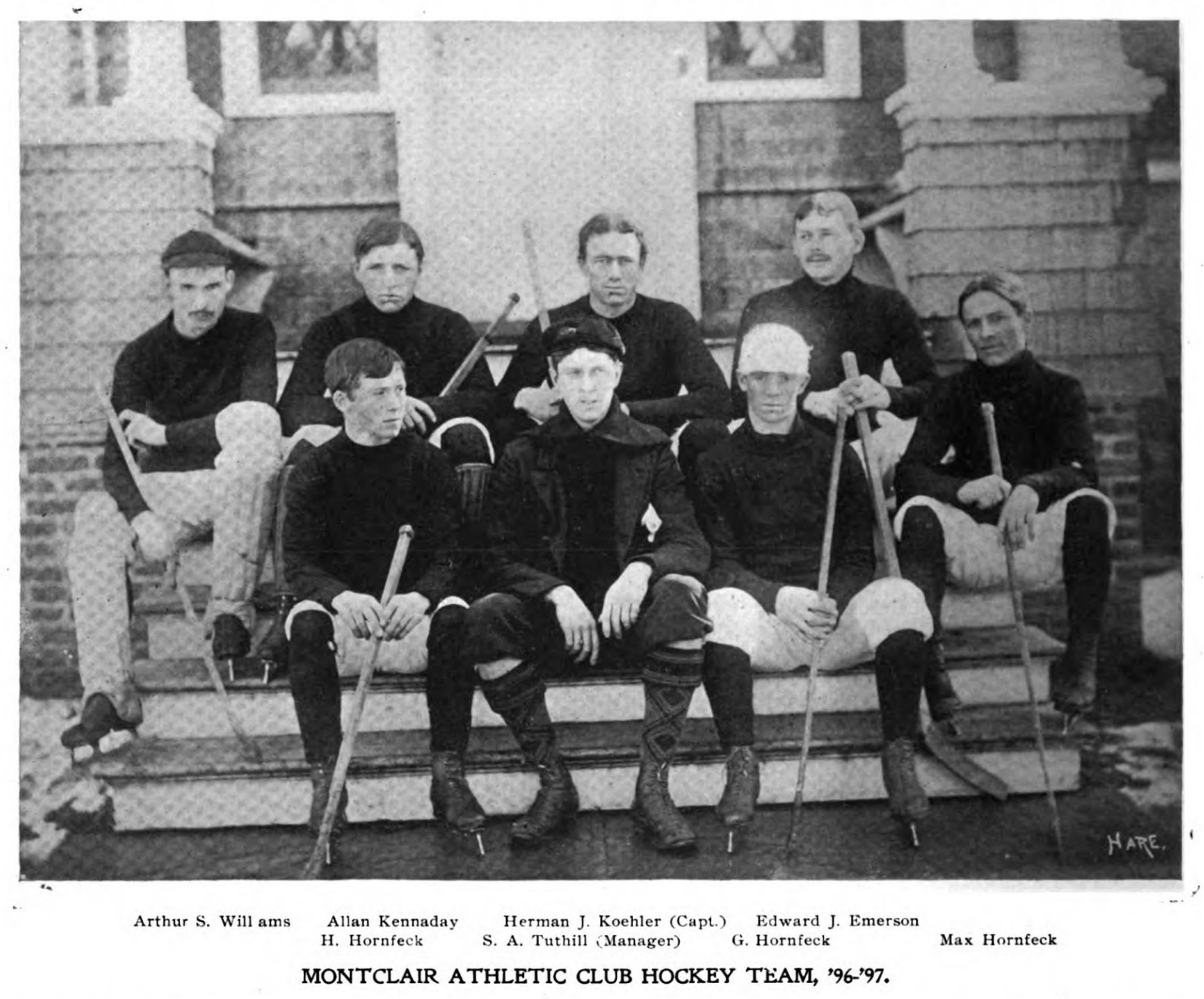
Hornfeck, at far right, with the 1896–97 Montclair Athletic Club. His brothers Henry and Gustave are also seated in the front row.

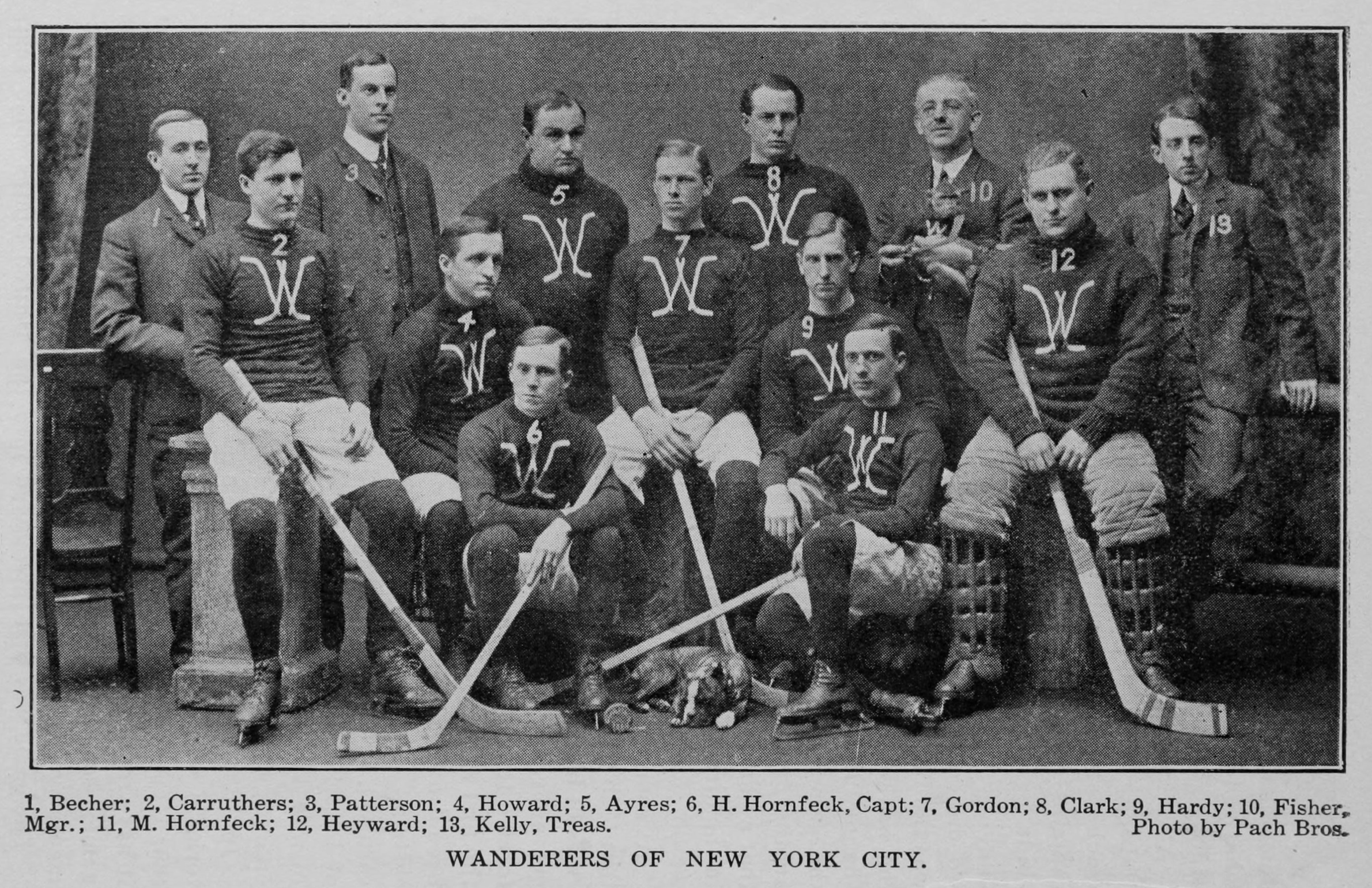
Hornfeck (11) while a member of the New York Wanderers in 1903–04. His brother Henry Hornfeck (6) is also seated in the front row.

Exh. = Exhibition games

=== Regular season ===
			Regular season
Season	Team	League	GP	G	A	Pts
1896–97	Montclair AC	Exh.	–	–	–	–
1897–98	Montclair AC	AAHL	8	3	0	3
1898–99	Montclair AC	AAHL	8	3	3	6
1899–1900	New York AC	AAHL	12	11	2	13
1900–01	New York AC	AAHL	11	8	7	15
1901–02	New York AC	AAHL	9	8	3	12
1902–03	New York AC	AAHL	5	1	1	2
1903–04	New York Wanderers	AAHL	8	7	0	7
1904–05	New York Wanderers	AAHL	6	4	2	6
1905–06	New York HC	AAHL	3	1	0	1
1906–07	New York HC	AAHL	1	0	1	1
1907–08	New York Wanderers	AAHL	4	0	0	0
Totals			75	46	19	65

Statistics from Society for International Hockey Research (sihrhockey.org)
