= Moylan McDonnell =

Canadian ice hockey player

- Born: August 27, 1889 Stony Mountain, Manitoba, Canada
- Died: January 22, 1969 (aged 79) New York City, New York, U.S.
- Height: 5 ft 9 in (175 cm)
- Weight: 145 lb (66 kg; 10 st 5 lb)
- Position: Defence
- Shot: Right
- Played for: Brooklyn Crescents; New York Irish-Americans; New York Wanderers; New York Hockey Club; Hamilton Tigers
- Playing career: 1909–1921

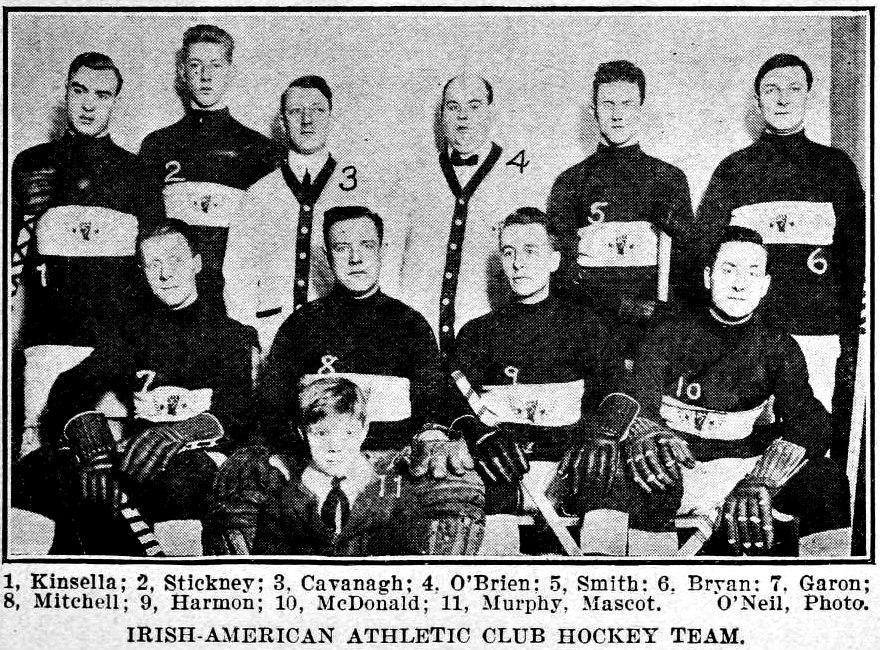
McDonnell, at bottom right (inaccurately named 'McDonald'), with the 1912–13 New York Irish-Americans.

Moylan James McDonnell (August 27, 1889 – January 22, 1969) was a Canadian hockey defenceman who played one season in the National Hockey League with the Hamilton Tigers in 1920–21. Before joining the Tigers he spent several years playing amateur hockey in New York City, and after retiring coached Princeton University for one season.

== Playing career ==
Born in Stony Mountain, Manitoba, McDonnell would make a name for himself among amateur hockey clubs in New York. He played for the Brooklyn Crescents, New York Irish-Americans, New York Wanderers and the New York Hockey Club between 1909 and 1916. He served during World War I for the next three years and was signed as a free agent by the Hamilton Tigers in December 1920. He retired after his first NHL season.

== After the NHL ==
In 1921–22 McDonnell coached the Princeton University Tigers ice hockey team in the intercollegiate circuit to a 3-6-1 (.350) record.

Not much is known about McDonnell (spelled MacDonell in US Immigration documents) except that he and his wife, Dorothy, lived in New York City, where Moylan was employed at the Federal Reserve Bank at least through 1942.

== Career statistics ==
=== Regular season and playoffs ===
			Regular season					Playoffs
Season	Team	League	GP	G	A	Pts	PIM	GP	G	A	Pts	PIM
1909–10	Brooklyn Crescents	AAHL	8	7	0	7	—	—	—	—	—	—
1910–11	Brooklyn Crescents	AAHL	—	—	—	—	—	—	—	—	—	—
1911–12	Edmonton Maritimers	ASHL	6	5	0	5	6	4	1	0	1	10
1912–13	New York Irish-Americans	AAHL	8	4	0	4	12	—	—	—	—	—
1913–14	New York Irish-Americans	AAHL	4	2	0	2	—	—	—	—	—	—
1914–15	New York Hockey Club	AAHL	7	7	0	7	—	—	—	—	—	—
1915–16	New York Hockey Club	AAHL	8	6	0	6	—	—	—	—	—	—
1920–21	Hamilton Tigers	NHL	22	1	2	3	2	—	—	—	—	—
NHL totals			22	1	2	3	2	—	—	—	—	—

== Awards and accomplishments ==
- AHAA First All-Star Team (1914, 1915)
- AAHL Second All-Star Team (1916)

== Head coaching record ==
Record table
Season	Team	Overall	Conference	Standing	Postseason
Princeton Tigers (THL) (1921–1922)
1921–22	Princeton	3–6–1	0–4–0	3rd	
Princeton:		3–6–1			
Total:		3–6–1			
National champion Postseason invitational champion Conference regular season champion Conference regular season and conference tournament champion Division regular season champion Division regular season and conference tournament champion Conference tournament champion
