= John McGrath (ice hockey) =

Ice hockey player (1891-1924)

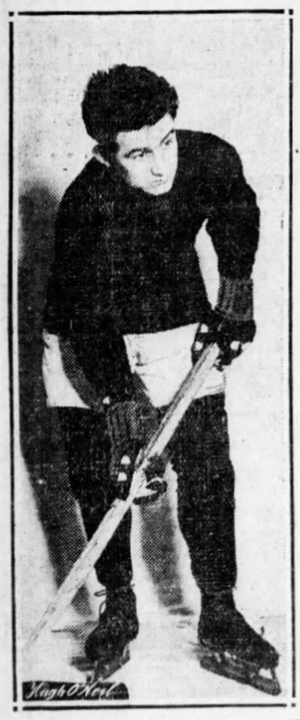
- McGrath with the New York Wanderers in 1912
- Born: March 10, 1891 St. John's, Newfoundland, British Empire
- Died: February 18, 1924 (aged 32) Newton Centre, Massachusetts, U.S.
- Height: 5 ft 2 in (157 cm)
- Position: Right wing
- Shot: Right
- Played for: Halifax Crescents; New York Wanderers; New York Irish-Americans
- Playing career: 1906–1917

John William McGrath (March 10, 1891 – February 18, 1924) was a Canadian amateur ice hockey player and private secretary and advisor to former President of the United States Theodore Roosevelt between 1912 and 1916.

== Biography ==
John McGrath was born on March 10, 1891, in St. John's, Newfoundland to James Francis McGrath, a fisherman and political figure in Newfoundland, and Catherine McCarthy. He went to Saint Bonaventure's College in St. John's and later to Dalhousie University in Halifax, Nova Scotia. While in Halifax McGrath played with the Halifax Crescents of the Nova Scotia Senior Hockey League (NSSHL), between 1908 and 1911.

For the 1911–12 ice hockey season McGrath moved to New York City and found a place on the New York Wanderers in the American Amateur Hockey League. McGrath led the AAHL with 18 goals during the season but the Wanderers lost the championship title to the Brooklyn Crescents in a playoff game. McGrath was a diminutive player, standing only 5 feet and 2 inches, but he had a rough and tumble playing style and a hard shot that helped him score many goals.

McGrath was expelled from the AAHL after the 1911–12 season, after a hold-up dispute towards the St. Nicholas Skating Rink management, and did not play during the 1912–13 season, but he was reinstated by the league prior to the 1913–14 season and played for the New York Irish-Americans in 1913–14, 1914–15 and 1916–17, again leading the league in goals in 1913–14.

While in New York City McGrath's proficiency as a stenographer led him to a private secretarial position with former President of the United States Theodore Roosevelt. He worked as a secretary and advisor for Roosevelt for five years, between 1912 and 1916, and he was with him on his presidential election campaign tour in Milwaukee, Wisconsin, on October 14, 1912, when Roosevelt was shot in an assassination attempt by saloonkeeper John Flammang Schrank. In March of 1916 he was convicted of assault for a fight in which he and a cousin said they were defending a woman from a man whose leg was broken in the fracas however the conviction was later reversed.

McGrath later worked as a secretary for American politician and businessman George Walbridge Perkins, a friend of his former employer Theodore Roosevelt. Through Perkins he got involved in the fishing business and ran a fishing company in Boston.

He died in Newton Centre, Massachusetts, on February 18, 1924, 32 years old, after a brief period of illness. He was survived by his wife Florence Stenbeck and six children.

== Statistics ==
NSSHL = Nova Scotia Senior Hockey League, AAHL = American Amateur Hockey League

			Regular season					Playoffs
Season	Team	League	GP	G	A	Pts	PIM	GP	G	A	Pts	PIM
1908–09	Halifax Crescents	NSSHL	1	1	0	1	0	–	–	–	–	–
1909–10	Halifax Crescents	NSSHL	2	1	1	2	5	–	–	–	–	–
1910–11	Halifax Crescents	NSSHL	–	–	–	–	–	–	–	–	–	–
1911–12	New York Wanderers	AAHL	9	18	3	21	–	–	–	–	–	–
1912–13	Did not play
1913–14	New York Irish-Americans	AAHL	8	12	1	13	–	–	–	–	–	–
1914–15	New York Irish-Americans	AAHL	8	7	0	7	8	–	–	–	–	–
1915–16	Did not play
1916–17	New York Irish-Americans	AAHL	1	0	0	0	0	–	–	–	–	–
NSSHL totals			3	2	1	3	5	–	–	–	–	–
AAHL totals			26	37	4	41	–	–	–	–	–	–

Statistics per Society for International Hockey Research at sihrhockey.org
