= Billy Lacken =

Canadian ice hockey player

- Born: July 3, 1888; Montreal, Quebec, Canada
- Died: September 26, 1916 (aged 28); Courcelette, France
- Height: 5 ft 6.5 in (169 cm)
- Position: Center
- Shot: Right
- Played for: Montreal Wanderers; New York Wanderers
- Playing career: 1907–1912

William Joseph Charles Lacken (July 3, 1888 – September 26, 1916) was a Canadian amateur ice hockey player who played for the Montreal Wanderers in the Eastern Canada Amateur Hockey Association (ECAHL).

== Early life and hockey career ==
Lacken was born on July 3, 1888, in Montreal to William and Mary Seale Lacken. He first played for Montreal CPR of the Montreal Manufacturers Hockey League, before joining the Montreal Wanderers in season 1908–09 and appearing twice. After playing for the Montreal Stars in 1910, Lacken moved to the United States to play for the New York Athletic Club, but was signed to the New York Wanderers. He appeared 8 times and scored 10 goals.

== Military career and death ==
Lacken worked as a clerk and served in the 17th Duke of York's Hussars for 3 years. To serve in World War I, he re-enlisted in the Canadian Expeditionary Force on August 27, 1914, and was assigned to the 15th Battalion. In August 1916, Lacken was promoted to lance corporal; however, his rank was reverted to private upon his request. He was killed on the Western Front at Regina Trench, Courcelette on September 26, 1916, and is commemorated at the Vimy Memorial.

== Career statistics ==
| | | | Regular season | | | | | Playoffs |
| Season | Team | League | GP | G | A | Pts | PIM | GP | G | A | Pts | PIM |
|---|---|---|---|---|---|---|---|---|---|---|---|---|
| 1907–08 | Montreal CPR | Mtl Mfgrs HL | 1 | 0 | 0 | 0 | 0 | – | – | – | – | – |
| 1908–09 | Montreal Wanderers | ECAHA | 2 | – | – | – | – | – | – | – | – | – |
| 1909–10 | Montreal Stars | Mtl CSHL | 6 | 3 | 0 | 3 | 18 | – | – | – | – | – |
| 1911–12 | New York Wanderers | AAHL | 8 | 10 | 4 | 14 | – | – | – | – | – | – |
| Career totals | | | 17 | 13 | 4 | 17 | 18 | – | – | – | – | – |
