= Lacken =

Lacken may refer to:

- Lacken, Austria
- Lacken, Belgium
- Lacken, County Mayo, Ireland
- Lacken, County Wexford, Ireland
- Lacken, County Wicklow, Ireland

== See also ==
- Billy Lacken (1888–1916), Canadian ice hockey player
