= Montclair Athletic Club (ice hockey) =

- City: Montclair, New Jersey, USA
- League: American Amateur Hockey League; 1897–98 – 1898–99
- Founded: 1895–96
- Home arena: Clermont Avenue Rink (1897–98); St. Nicholas Rink (1898–99)
- General manager: J.A. Tuthill
- Captain: Herman Koehler (1896–97)

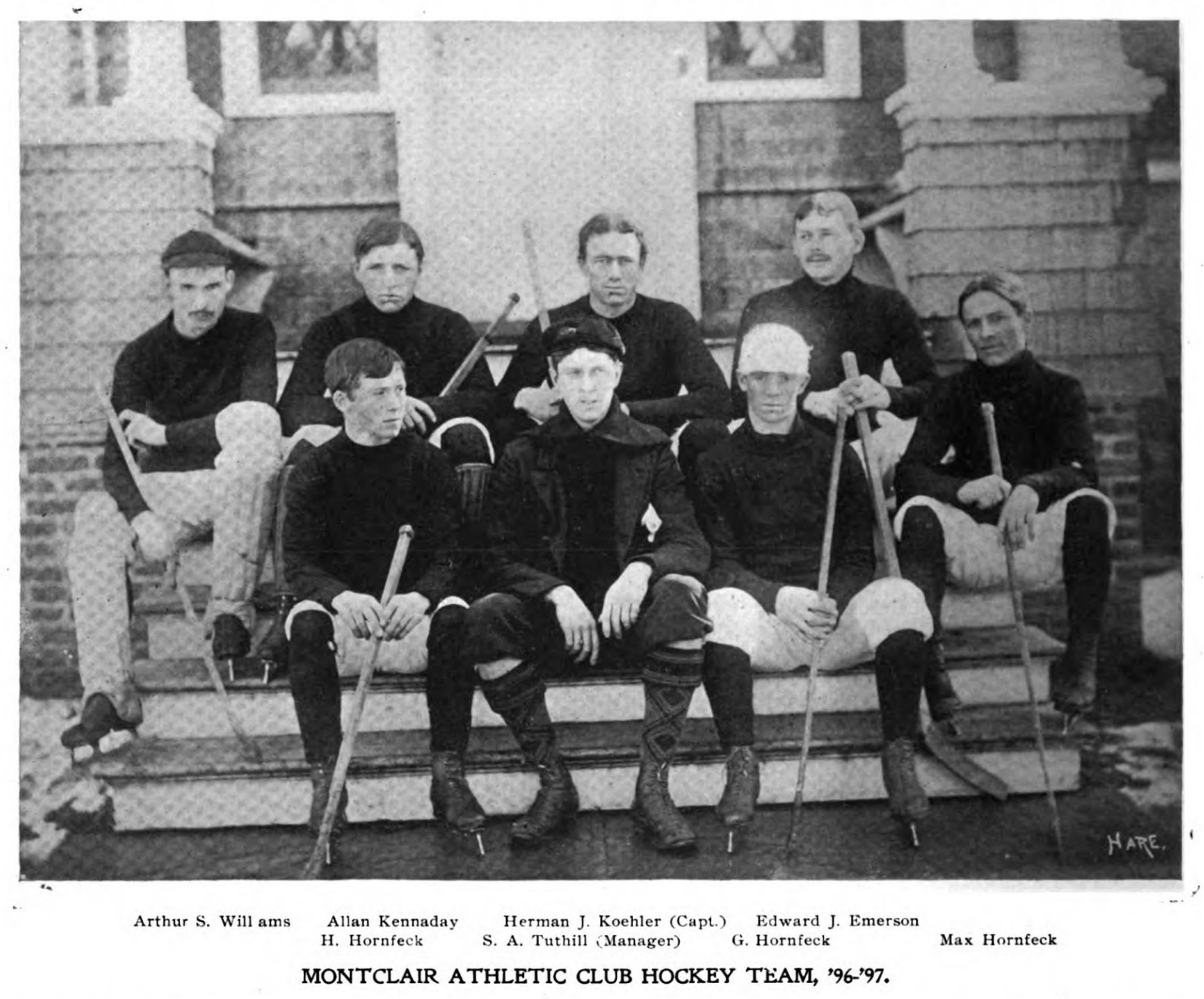
Montclair Athletic Club in 1896–97. Top row: Arthur Williams, Allan Kennaday, Herman Koehler, Teddy Emerson. Front row: Henry Hornfeck, J. A. Tuthill (manager), Gustave Hornfeck, Max Hornfeck.

The Montclair Athletic Club was an amateur ice hockey team from Montclair, New Jersey in existence during the late 1890s. Montclair Athletic Club played one game during the 1895–96 season and exhibition games during the 1896–97 season against opponents from New York City and New Jersey, as well as against Queen's University (of Kingston, Ontario) and an All-Baltimore aggregation.

During the 1897–98 and 1898–99 seasons the team played in the American Amateur Hockey League against teams from New York City.

Notable players on the team were Max Hornfeck and Herman Koehler.

Spalding Athletic Library published Ice Hockey guide (with rules) edited by JA Tuthill of the Montclair AC in 1898.
