= Herman Koehler (end) =

American football and ice hockey player (1873–1931)

Profile
- Position: End

Personal information
- Born: July 15, 1873; Upper Montclair, New Jersey
- Died: 1931 (aged 57–58)
- Listed height: 5 ft 10 in (1.78 m)
- Listed weight: 160 lb (73 kg)

Career information
- College: North Carolina (1898–1899)

Awards and highlights
- Southern championship (1898); All-Southern (1898, 1899)

Herman Jules Koehler (July 15, 1873 – September–December 1931) was an American college football player, amateur ice hockey player and outdoorsman.

== Biography ==
Koehler was born in Upper Montclair, New Jersey on July 15, 1873.

Koehler was an experienced outdoorsman and made several trips across Labrador and northern Quebec. He is believed to have died sometime between September and December in 1931 while trying to pass Labrador from Kuujjuaq with fellow New Jerseyman Fred Connell and guide Jimmy Martin from Cartwright. Koehler's and Connell's bodies were found five kilometers apart while Martin's body was never found.

=== University of North Carolina ===
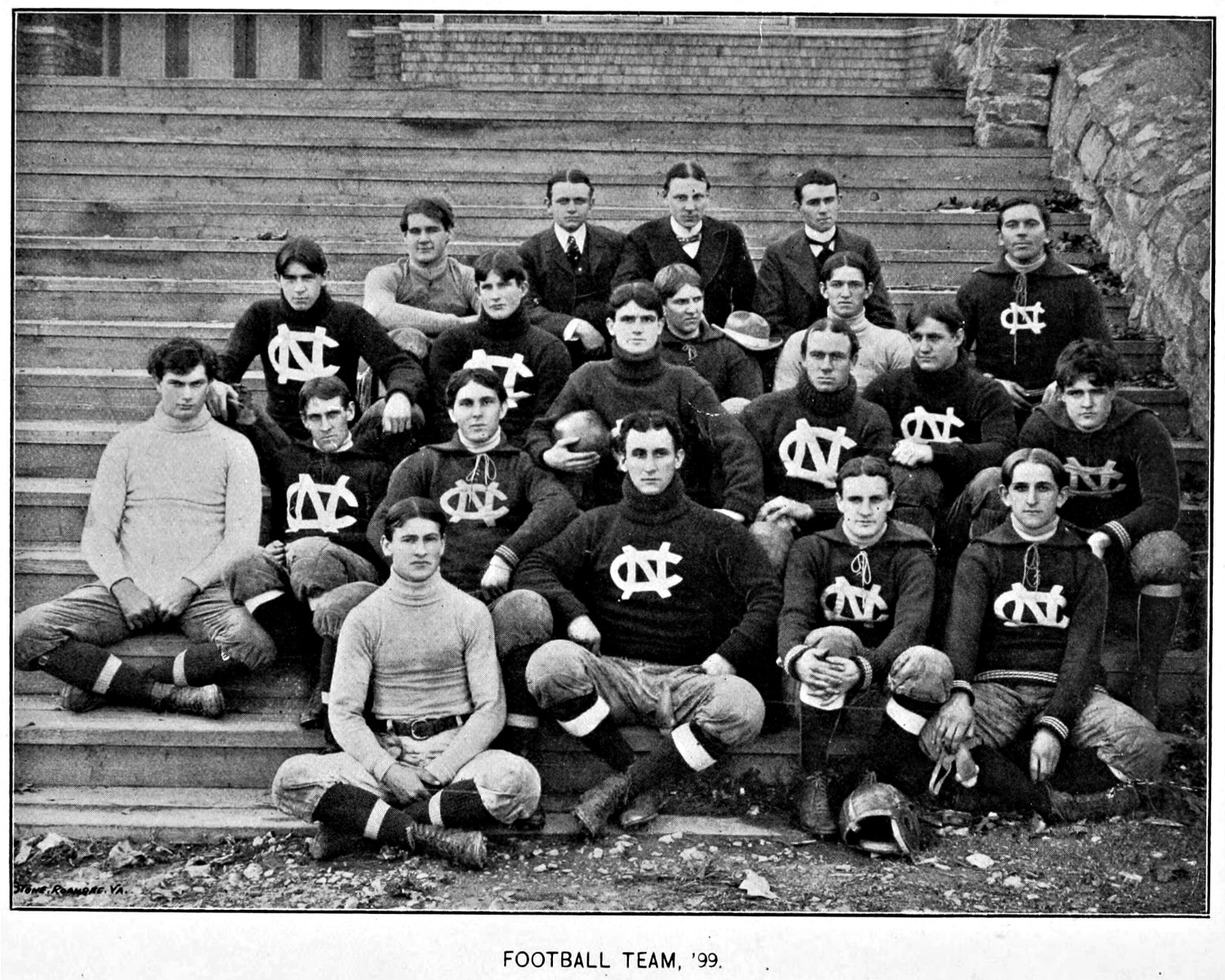
Koehler, third from the right in the second row, with the 1899 North Carolina Tar Heels football team.

He was a prominent end for the North Carolina Tar Heels football team of the University of North Carolina. He was selected second-team for an all-time Carolina football team in 1934. Dr. Joel Whitaker put him on his all-time team, ranking him the second best end in the history of the school up to that time. He notes that Koehler came to the university with experience, for he played on the Orange Athletic Club with Frank Coyne.

Koehler was selected All-Southern in 1898 and 1899.

=== Ice hockey ===
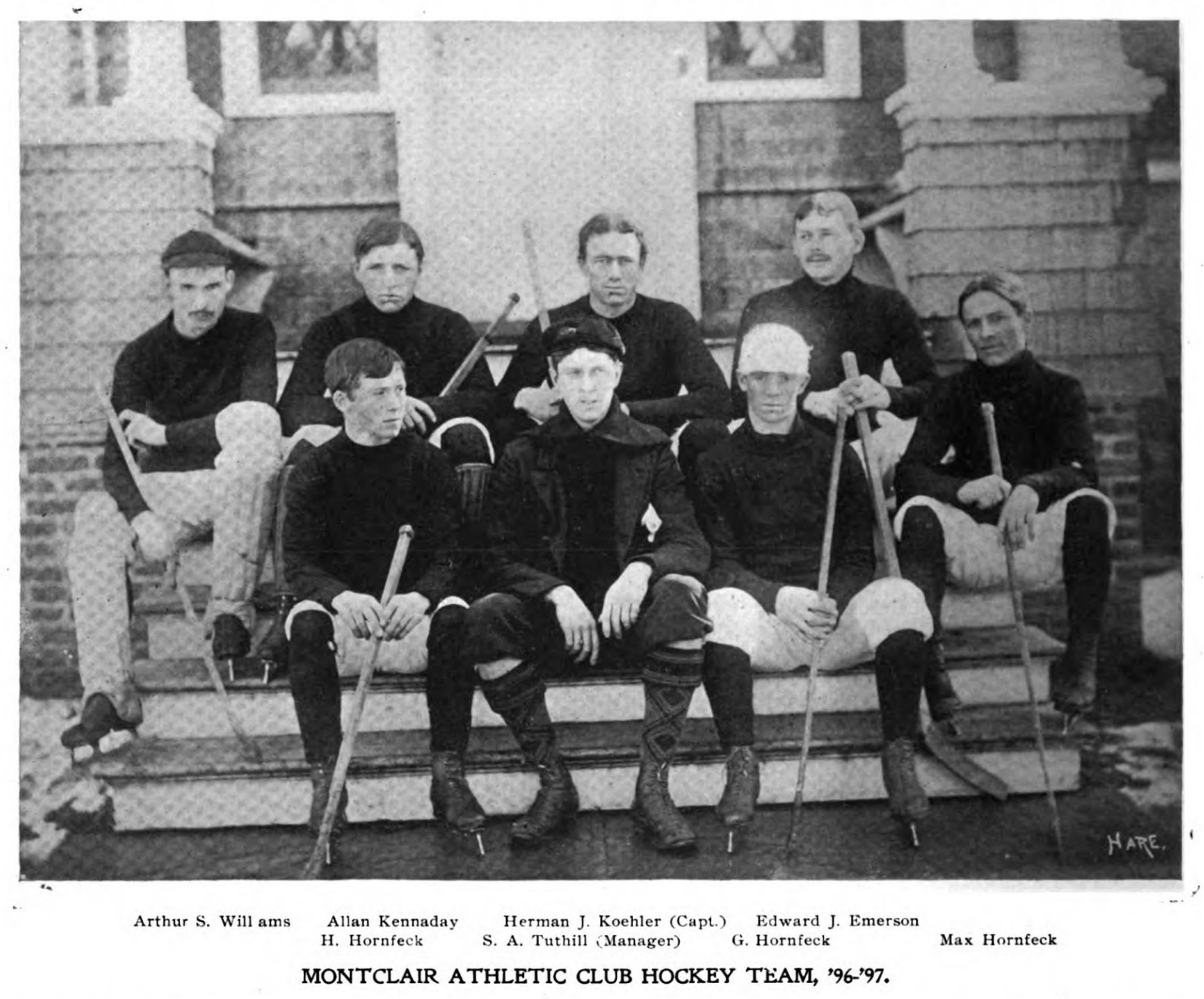
Koehler, third from the left in the top row, with the Montclair Athletic Club ice hockey team in 1896–97.

Koehler was also an amateur ice hockey player with his hometown team Montclair Athletic Club in Montclair, New Jersey. He captained the team during the 1896–97 season, and also appeared with the team in the American Amateur Hockey League in 1897–98 and 1898–99.
