= Tom Howard (ice hockey) =

Canadian ice hockey player

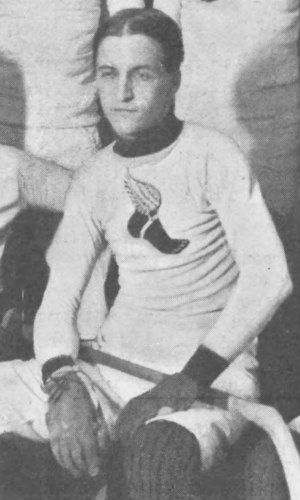
- Howard with the New York Athletic Club in 1901.
- Born: January 5, 1871 Winnipeg, Manitoba, Canada
- Died: November 18, 1945 (aged 74) Los Angeles, California, United States
- Weight: 150 lb (68 kg; 10 st 10 lb)
- Position: Right wing/cover point
- Shot: Right
- Played for: Winnipeg Victorias; New York Athletic Club; Pittsburgh Keystones; New York Wanderers; Brooklyn Skating Club
- Playing career: 1890–1906

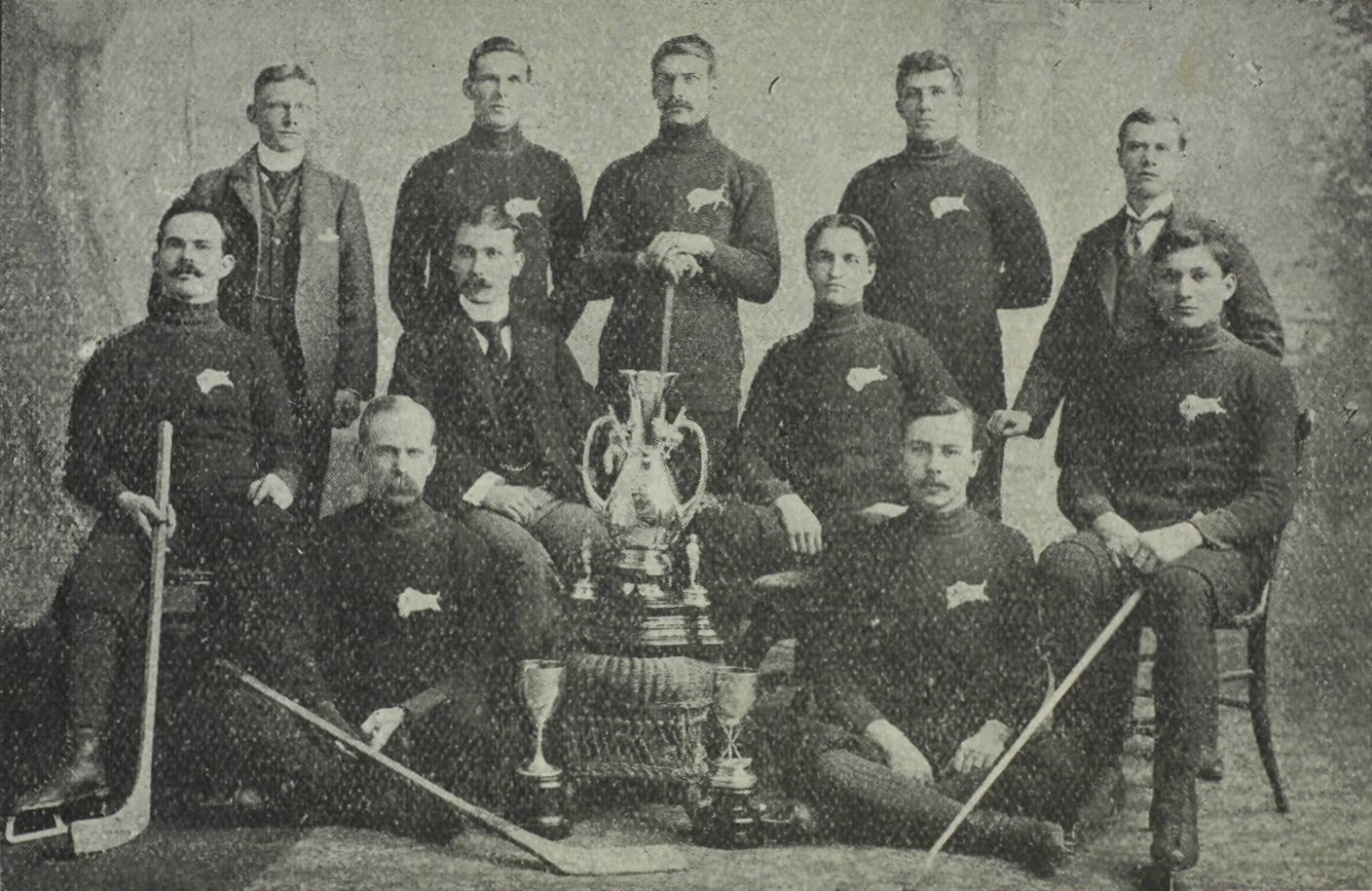
Howard, second from the right in the middle row, with the 1898–99 Winnipeg Victorias.

Thomas Acheson "Attie" Howard (January 5, 1871 – November 18, 1945) was a Canadian amateur ice hockey player in the era before professional ice hockey. He was a member of the 1896 Winnipeg Victorias Stanley Cup championship team. He later played in the American Amateur Hockey League (AAHL) and in the Western Pennsylvania Hockey League (WPHL) in the United States of America.

== Playing and coaching career ==
Tom Howard joined the Winnipeg Victorias in 1890 and during the 1890–91 season the team played non-league games against the city-rival Winnipeg Hockey Club. He was one of the charter members of the Winnipeg Victorias alongside fellow players Jack Armytage, George "Whitey" Merritt, Fred Higginbotham and multi-athlete Jack McCulloch. He played nine seasons for the club, winning the Stanley Cup in 1896 (against the Montreal Victorias) and playing in a Stanley Cup challenge series in 1899 (also against the Montreal Victorias).

In 1899–1900, Howard moved to New York City with his wife and two sons and played four seasons with the New York Athletic Club. He played two seasons with the New York Wanderers (1903–1905) and one game with the Brooklyn Skating Club in 1905–06 to end his career. He scored 105 goals in 100 games during his career.

=== Playing manager ===
During his last active season as a player, in 1905–06, Howard acted as a playing manager of the Brooklyn Skating Club. At the onset of the season Howard tried to acquire a group of Canadian players, mostly from Montreal, among them Frank "Pud" Glass of the Montreal Wanderers and Ernie "Moose" Johnson of the Montreal Hockey Club. The AAHL rules committee ruled the Canadian players ineligible to play with the American club on counts of professionalism, and the Brooklyn Skating Club team ceased its operations two games into the season.

After 1910, Howard joined A.G. Spalding & Co. of New York. He endorsed a hockey stick model and edited the Spalding Ice Hockey Guides. He also coached several different hockey teams, both in the AAHL (New York Hockey Club) and within the American intercollegiate ice hockey circuit (Yale and Columbia).

== Playing style ==
Howard played the predominant bulk of his ice hockey career as a right winger. He was a speedy skater prone to quick dashes down his side of the rink, and he also possessed a good and hard shot. During his time with the New York Wanderers in the AAHL (1903–1905) he played on the cover point position (equivalent to an offensive defenseman in today's hockey).

" ... Howard had coaxed back the form which has made him famous. His frequent journeys down the rink side were as brilliant as chain-lightning over a dark sky. He had the speed of a schoolboy and the cleverness of a master. His skating, criss-cross dribbling and shots which seemed to fairly leap for the net were beautiful to look upon."

– Brooklyn Daily Eagle describing Tom Howard in a game with the New York Wanderers in 1904–05

== Family ==
Tom Howard had two sons, Tom Howard Jr. (b. 1894) and Jack Howard (b. 1896), with his wife Kathleen Howard (née Cronn). Tom Jr. and Jack both played with the New York Hockey Club in the AAHL during the 1916–17 season. Kathleen Howard was a hockey player and manager herself and managed a girls team branch of the St. Nicholas Hockey Club.

Jack Howard died in an automobile crash on December 21, 1919 at an age of 23. The car was driven by his older brother Tom.

Tom Howard eventually moved to Los Angeles, where he died at the age of 74 in 1945.

== Career statistics ==
=== Regular season ===
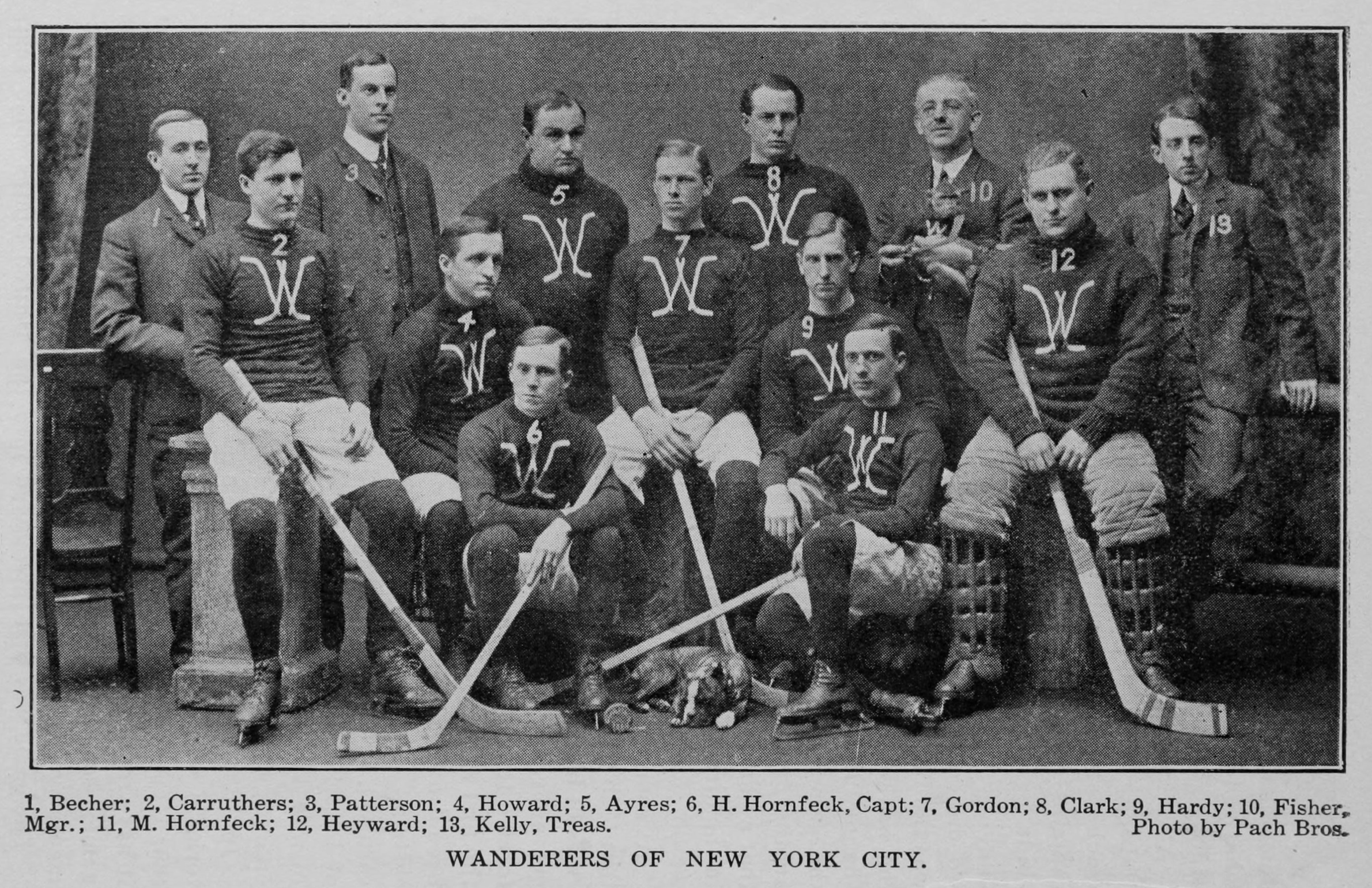
Howard (4) with the 1903–04 New York Wanderers.

WpgSr = Winnipeg Senior Hockey (no league)

			Regular season
Season	Team	League	GP	G	A	Pts	PIM
1890–91	Winnipeg Victorias	WpgSr	2	0	0	0	0
1891–92	Winnipeg Victorias	WpgSr	7	6	0	6	0
1892–93	Winnipeg Victorias	MNWHA	9	10	1	11	0
1893–94	Winnipeg Victorias	MNWHA	5	8	1	9	3
1894–95	Winnipeg Victorias	MNWHA	3	3	3	6	0
1895–96	Winnipeg Victorias	MNWHA	5	3	5	8	3
1896–97	Winnipeg Victorias	MNWHA	5	3	2	5	16
1897–98	Winnipeg Victorias	MNWHA	5	8	2	10	3
1898–99	Winnipeg Victorias	MNWHA	3	6	2	8	10
1899–1900	New York Athletic Club	AAHL	12	13	2	15	3
1900–01	New York Athletic Club	AAHL	9	14	4	18	0
	Pittsburgh Keystones	WPHL	2	4	0	4	–
1901–02	New York Athletic Club	AAHL	9	11	4	15	11
1902–03	New York Athletic Club	AAHL	9	8	10	18	6
1903–04	New York Wanderers	AAHL	6	4	1	5	2
1904–05	New York Wanderers	AAHL	8	4	1	5	4
1905–06	Brooklyn Skating Club	AAHL	1	0	0	0	0
MHWHA totals			35	41	16	57	35
AAHL totals			54	54	22	76	26

=== Stanley Cup challenges ===
Season	Team	League	GP	G	A	Pts	PIM
1896	Winnipeg Victorias	MNWHA	2	2	0	2	0
1899	Winnipeg Victorias	MNWHA	2	1	0	1	0
Totals			4	3	0	3	0

Statistics from Society for International Hockey Research (sihrhockey.org)

== Awards and achievements ==
- Stanley Cup – 1896 (with Winnipeg Victorias)
- AAHL champion – 1903–04 (with New York Wanderers)
