= Odie Cleghorn =

Canadian ice hockey player

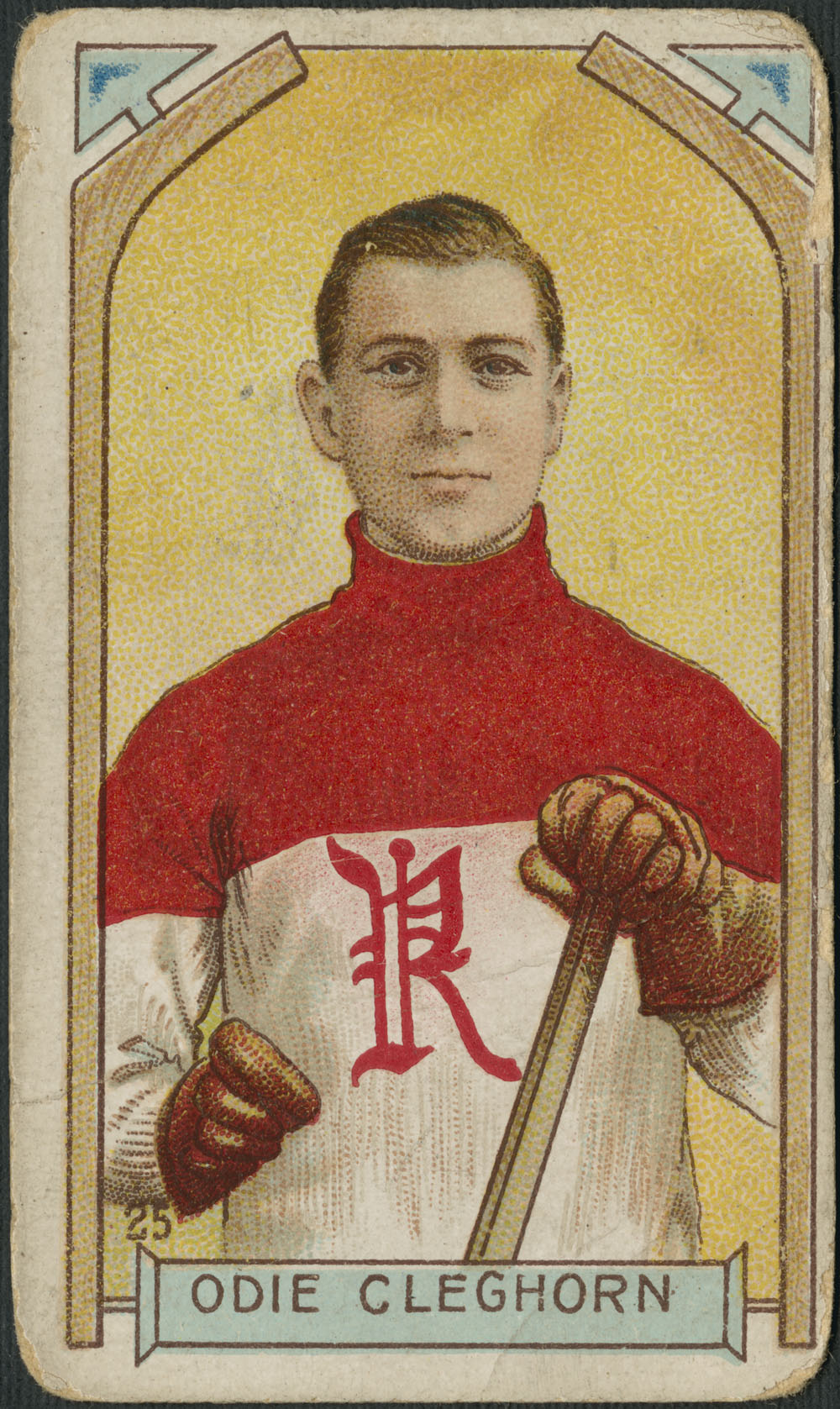
- Born: September 19, 1891 Montreal, Quebec, Canada
- Died: July 13, 1956 (aged 64) Montreal, Quebec, Canada
- Height: 5 ft 9 in (175 cm)
- Weight: 195 lb (88 kg; 13 st 13 lb)
- Position: Right Wing
- Shot: Right
- Played for: NHL: Montreal Canadiens; Pittsburgh Pirates; NHA: Montreal Wanderers; Renfrew Creamery Kings
- Playing career: 1910–1928

James Albert Ogilvie "Odie" Cleghorn (September 19, 1891 – July 13, 1956) was a Canadian professional ice hockey player, coach, linesman and referee. His brother Sprague Cleghorn also played professional ice hockey and the two played several seasons together.

== Ice hockey career ==
Odie Cleghorn came up through the ranks of the Montreal Westmount of the intermediate section of the CAHL, where he played alongside his older brother Sprague and future Hockey Hall of Fame referee Cooper Smeaton. For the 1909–10 season the trio left for New York to play for the New York Wanderers of the American Amateur Hockey League, finishing second in the league standing behind the New York Athletic Club. Although the Brooklyn Daily Eagle praised Cleghorn after the season as "one of the best right wings that ever has played on a New York team", the newspaper also brought criticism over his rough play "that kept him with the timers for long sessions in every contest.

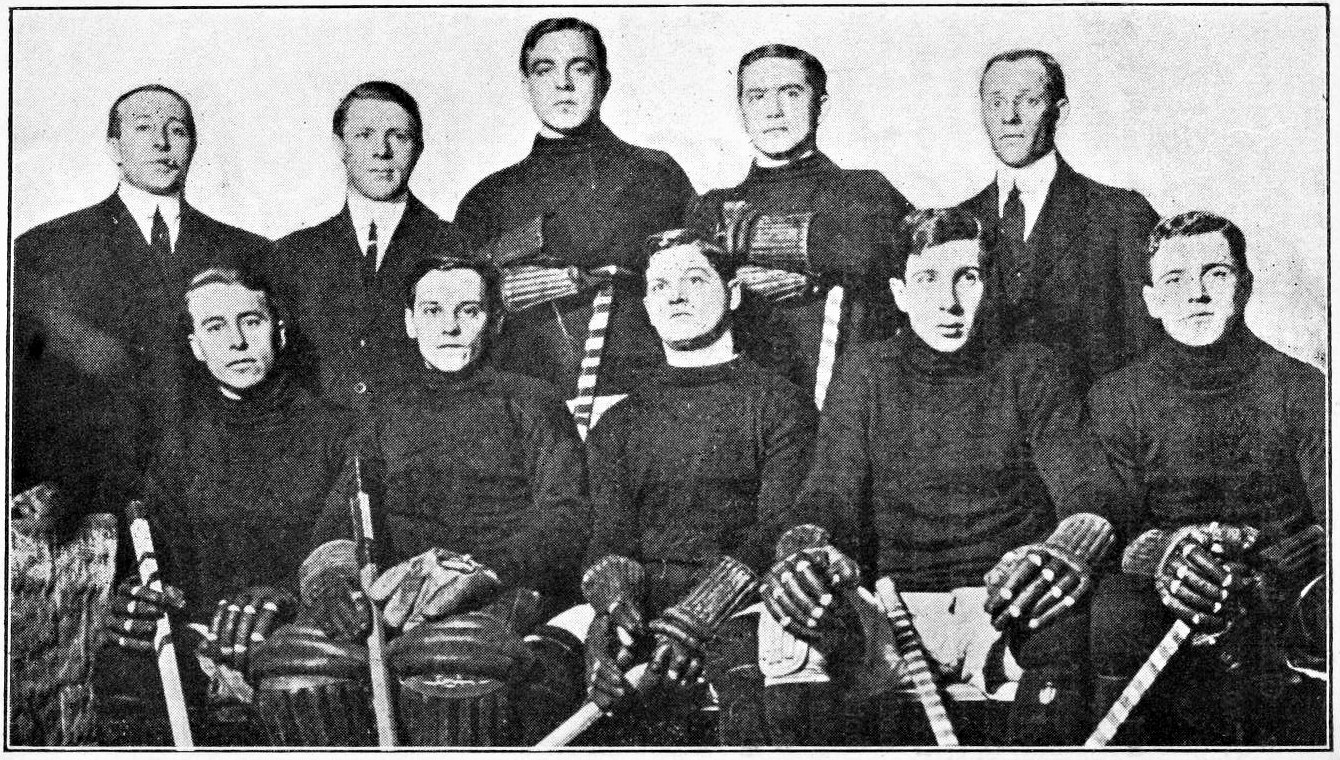
Odie Cleghorn, at far right in the front row, with the 1910 New York Wanderers, with brother Sprague right by his side.

The next season, in 1910–11, Odie and Sprague left New York to play with the Renfrew Creamery Kings of the National Hockey Association.

Cleghorn played ten seasons in the National Hockey League for the Montreal Canadiens and Pittsburgh Pirates. On Jan. 14, 1922, Odie and his brother Sprague Cleghorn each scored 4 goals in a 10-6 victory for the Montreal Canadiens over the Hamilton Tigers. Cleghorn won a Stanley Cup in 1924 with Montreal.

Cleghorn was also a coach of the Pirates. It was during the 1925–26 season that he created the idea of set lines. He would play three set lines that would rotate. Before this, the players would only rest when needed.

During the 1928 Stanley Cup Final, when New York Rangers's coach Lester Patrick had to step in as goalie for an injured Lorne Chabot, Odie took over Lester's duties as coach behind the Rangers bench for the rest of the game.

Cleghorn refereed for a time in the NHL. He was the referee at Boston Garden during the infamous December 12, 1933 game in which Boston's Eddie Shore severely injured Toronto's Irvine (Ace) Bailey, fracturing his skull and nearly killing him. Cleghorn was severely criticized by hockey writers for his lenient handling of the volatile game.

Odie Cleghorn's brother Sprague Cleghorn died of injuries following a car accident. Just a few hours before Sprague's July 14, 1956 funeral, Odie Cleghorn, was found in his bed, dead of heart failure, perhaps induced by the stress of the loss of his brother.

== Career statistics ==
			Regular season					Playoffs
Season	Team	League	GP	G	A	Pts	PIM	GP	G	A	Pts	PIM
1909–10	New York Wanderers	AAHL	8	15	0	15	—	—	—	—	—	—
1910–11	Renfrew Creamery Kings	NHA	16	20	0	20	66	—	—	—	—	—
1911–12	Montreal Wanderers	NHA	17	23	0	23	—	—	—	—	—	—
1911–12	NHA All-Stars	Exh.	3	1	0	1	5	—	—	—	—	—
1912–13	Montreal Wanderers	NHA	19	18	0	18	44	—	—	—	—	—
1912–13	NHA All-Stars	Exh.	5	7	–	7	–	—	—	—	—	—
1913–14	Montreal Wanderers	NHA	13	9	7	16	19	—	—	—	—	—
1914–15	Montreal Wanderers	NHA	15	21	5	26	39	2	0	0	0	12
1915–16	Montreal Wanderers	NHA	21	16	7	23	51	—	—	—	—	—
1916–17	Montreal Wanderers	NHA	18	28	4	32	49	—	—	—	—	—
1918–19	Montreal Canadiens	NHL	17	22	6	28	22	5	7	1	8	3
1918–19	Montreal Canadiens	St-Cup	—	—	—	—	—	5	2	0	2	9
1919–20	Montreal Canadiens	NHL	21	20	4	24	30	—	—	—	—	—
1920–21	Montreal Canadiens	NHL	21	6	6	12	8	—	—	—	—	—
1921–22	Montreal Canadiens	NHL	24	21	3	24	26	—	—	—	—	—
1922–23	Montreal Canadiens	NHL	24	19	6	25	18	2	0	0	0	2
1923–24	Montreal Canadiens	NHL	22	2	5	7	16	2	0	0	0	0
1923–24	Montreal Canadiens	St-Cup	—	—	—	—	—	4	0	2	2	0
1924–25	Montreal Canadiens	NHL	30	3	3	6	14	2	0	1	1	0
1924–25	Montreal Canadiens	St-Cup	—	—	—	—	—	4	0	0	0	0
1925–26	Pittsburgh Pirates	NHL	17	2	1	3	4	1	0	0	0	0
1926–27	Pittsburgh Pirates	NHL	3	0	0	0	0	—	—	—	—	—
1927–28	Pittsburgh Pirates	NHL	2	0	0	0	4	—	—	—	—	—
NHA totals			119	135	23	158	268	2	0	0	0	12
NHL totals			181	95	34	129	142	12	7	2	9	5
St-Cup totals			—	—	—	—	—	13	2	2	4	9

=== Coaching record ===
Team	Year	Regular season						Postseason
Team	Year	G	W	L	T	Pts	Division rank	Result
PIT	1925-26	36	19	16	1	39	3rd in American	Lost in Quarterfinals
PIT	1926-27	44	15	26	3	33	4th in American	Missed playoffs
PIT	1927-28	44	19	17	8	46	3rd in American	Lost in Quarterfinals
PIT	1928-29	44	9	27	8	26	4th in American	Missed Playoffs
Total		168	62	86	20	144		

Preceded by Position created	Head coach of the Pittsburgh Pirates; 1925–29	Succeeded by Frank Fredrickson
