= Clermont Avenue Skating Rink =

Former ice rink in Brooklyn, New York

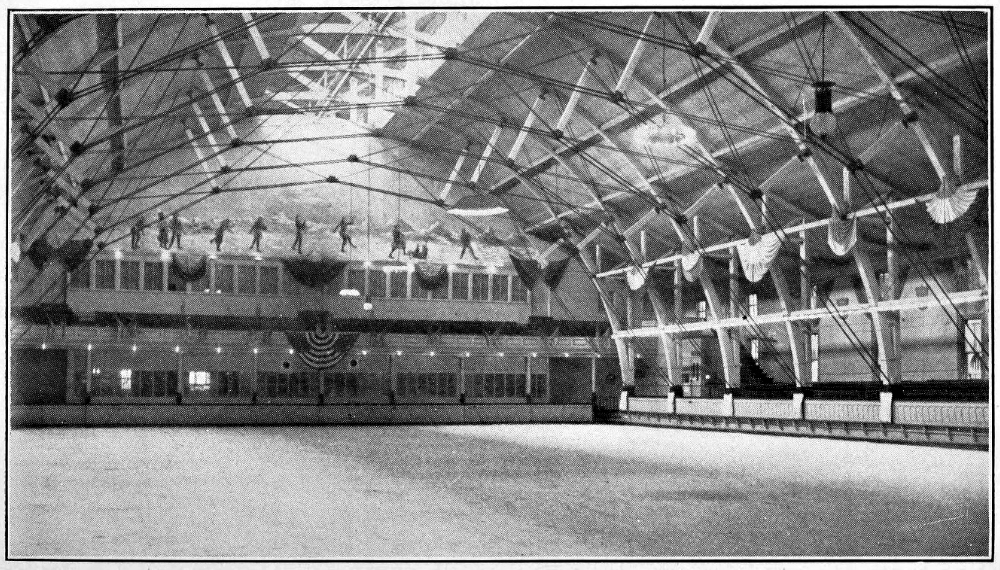
- Interior of the Clermont Avenue Skating Rink.
- Location: Clermont Avenue, Brooklyn, New York
- Surface: mechanically frozen ice
- Field size: 70x175 feet

Tenants
- Brooklyn Skating Club 1896–1906; Brooklyn Crescents 1896–1906

The Clermont Avenue Skating Rink was a sports arena on Clermont Avenue in Brooklyn, New York, United States. It was home to the Brooklyn Skating Club and the Brooklyn Crescents of the American Amateur Hockey League from 1896 to 1906.

The ice hockey team of the Brooklyn Skating Club folded in 1906 and the Brooklyn Crescents went on to play at the St. Nicholas Rink in Manhattan for the 1906–07 season as the Clermont Avenue Skating Rink instead was used for roller hockey.
