= Brooklyn Skating Club =

- City: Brooklyn, New York City; USA
- League: American Amateur Hockey League, 1896–1906
- Operated: 1896–1906
- Home arena: Clermont Avenue Skating Rink
- Colors: Light Blue, White (1896–1900) Maroon, White (1900–1906)
- General manager: Tom Howard, 1905–06
- Captain: Howard Drakeley, 1896–97; Edgerton Jennison, 1903–04; Tom Howard, 1905–06

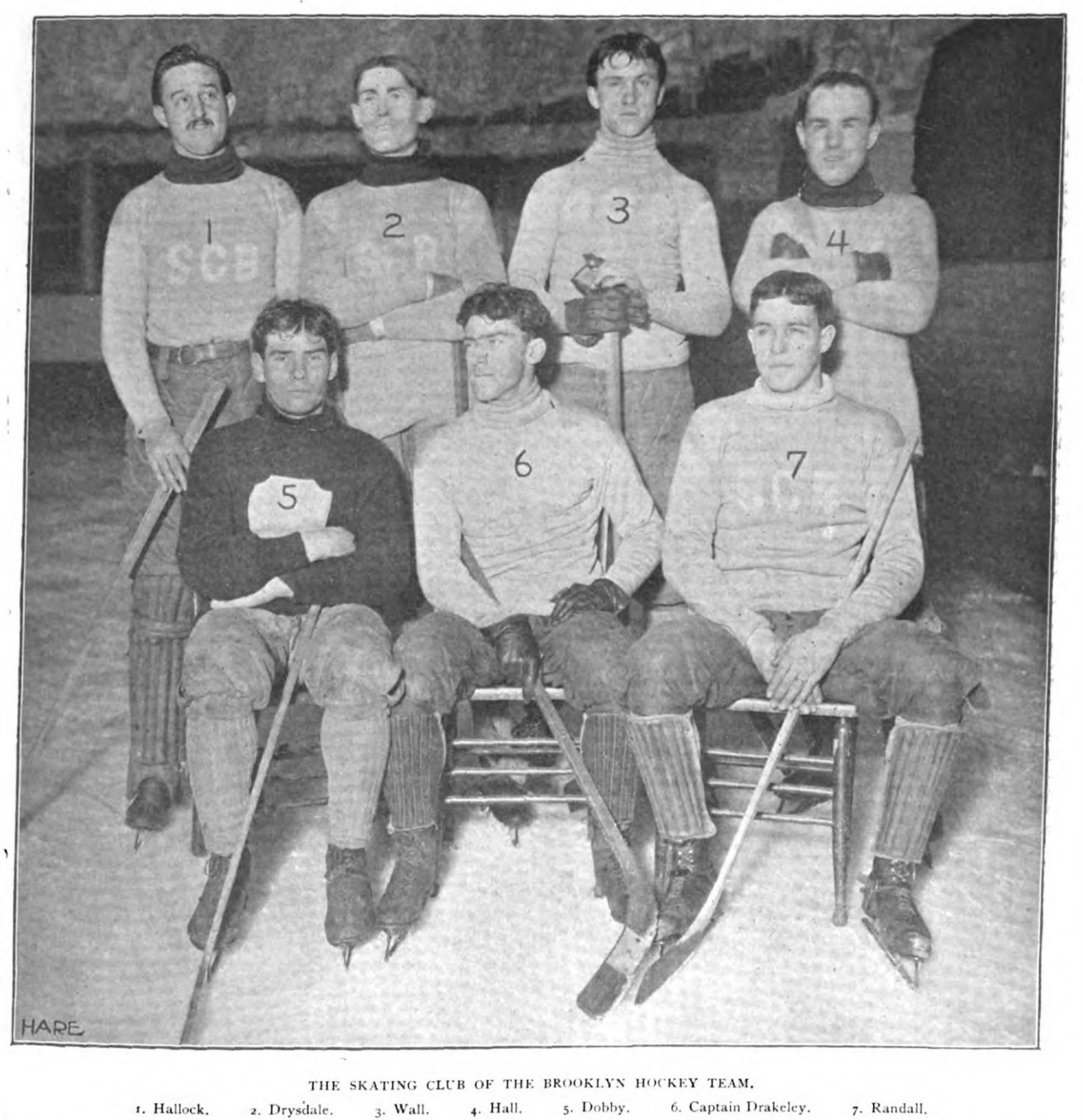
Brooklyn Skating Club in the 1897–98 season. Players: 1. Jack Hallock, 2. James Drysdale, 3. Bob Wall, 4. John Hall, 5. Bill Dobby, 6. Howard Drakeley, 7. Arthur Randall.

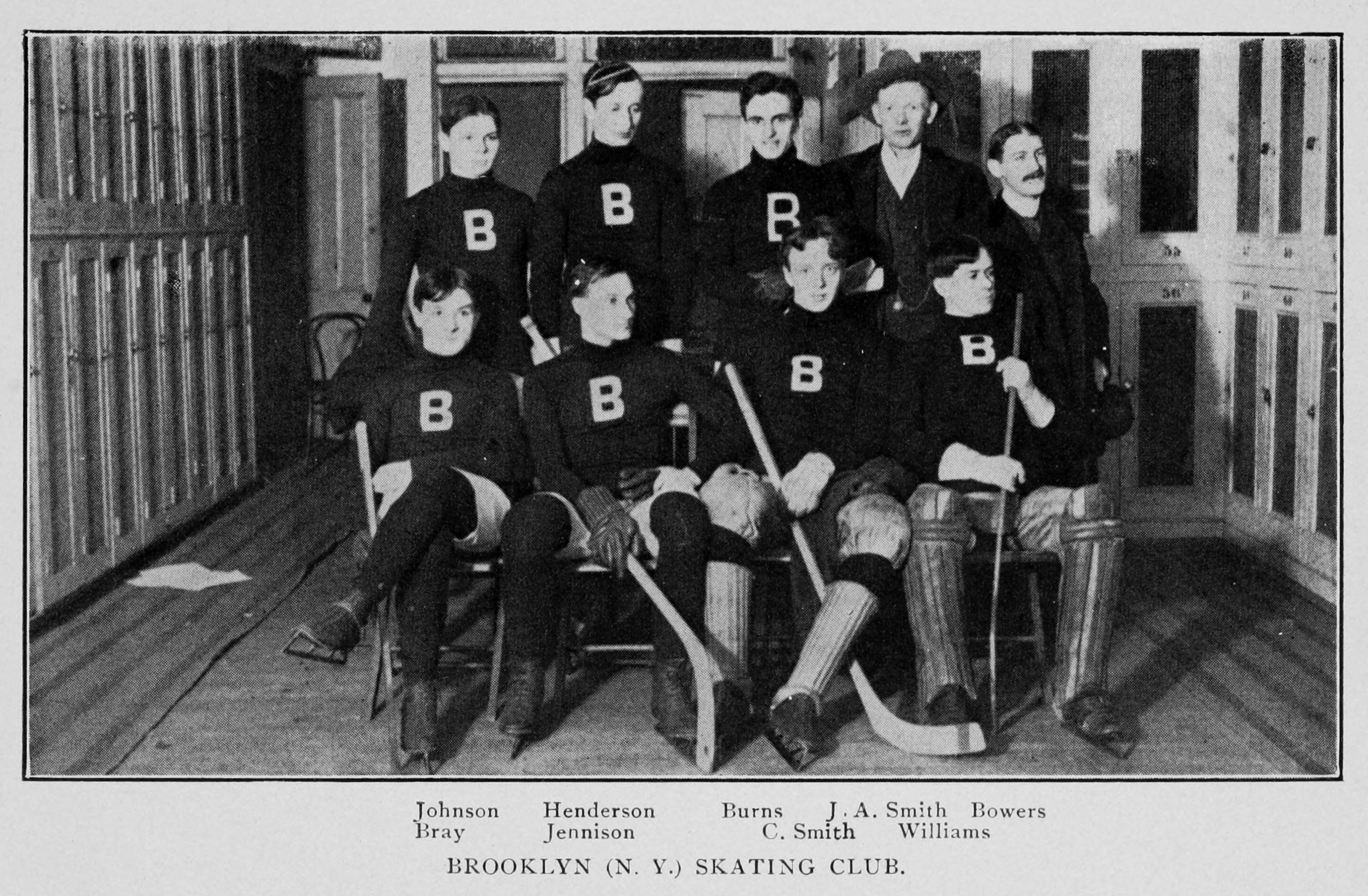
Brooklyn Skating Club in the 1903–04 season.

The Brooklyn Skating Club was an amateur ice hockey team from Brooklyn in New York City. The Brooklyn Skating Club played in the American Amateur Hockey League between 1896 and 1906 and won the championship title in 1898–99.

== History ==
The ice hockey team of the Brooklyn Skating Club played its home games at the Clermont Avenue Skating Rink in Brooklyn which they shared with fellow AAHL team Brooklyn Crescents.

In the 1897–98 season the Brooklyn Skating Club played in light blue colors with "S. C. B." in white letters on their sweaters.

The Brooklyn Skating Club won the 1898–99 AAHL championship (its third season) on February 21, 1899, after having defeated the New York Hockey Club 7 goals to 0. The roster was made out partly by Americans and partly by Canadians, the two most instrumental players being former Montreal Shamrocks players Bob Wall and Bill Dobby who had played with the Shamrocks in the AHAC.

Before the 1899–1900 season most players on the Brooklyn Skating Club (including Wall and Dobby) joined its local rival the Brooklyn Crescents (of the Crescent Athletic Club), and the team abruptly ceased being a contender for the league championship title.

Tom Howard, Stanley Cup champion with the 1896 Winnipeg Victorias, played one league game for the club (as playing manager) during the 1905–06 before the club ceased operations. At the onset of the 1905–06 season Howard tried to acquire a group of Canadian players, among them Ernie "Moose" Johnson, Frank "Pud" Glass and Horace Gaul to the club, in an attempt to ramp up the playing quality of the team, but the AAHL rules committee ruled the Canadians ineligible to play with the American club on counts of professionalism, and the Brooklyn Skating Club ice hockey team ceased its operations two games into the seasons.

=== Walter Huston ===
The famous Canadian-American actor Walter Huston (father of actor and film director John Huston and patriarch of the Huston acting family) played one league game for the Brooklyn Skating Club during the 1902–03 AAHL season (on the point position, i.e. defensive defenseman). American author John Weld (1905–2003), who was a personal friend of Walter Huston, describes in his Walter Huston biography September Song: An intimate biography of Walter Huston from 1998 how Canadian ice hockey player George Harmon, a childhood friend of Huston from Toronto, convinced Huston to dress up for the Brooklyn team playing its games on the "Claremont Rink". In the match report from the January 8, 1903 issue of the Brooklyn Daily Eagle Huston is described as "a Canadian".
