= St. Nicholas Hockey Club =

- City: New York City; USA
- League: AAHL (1896–1903, 1905–1918); USAHA (1920–1923)
- Founded: 1895
- Home arena: St. Nicholas Rink (1896–1962); Sky Rink at Chelsea Piers (Present)
- Colors: Olive Green, White, Red

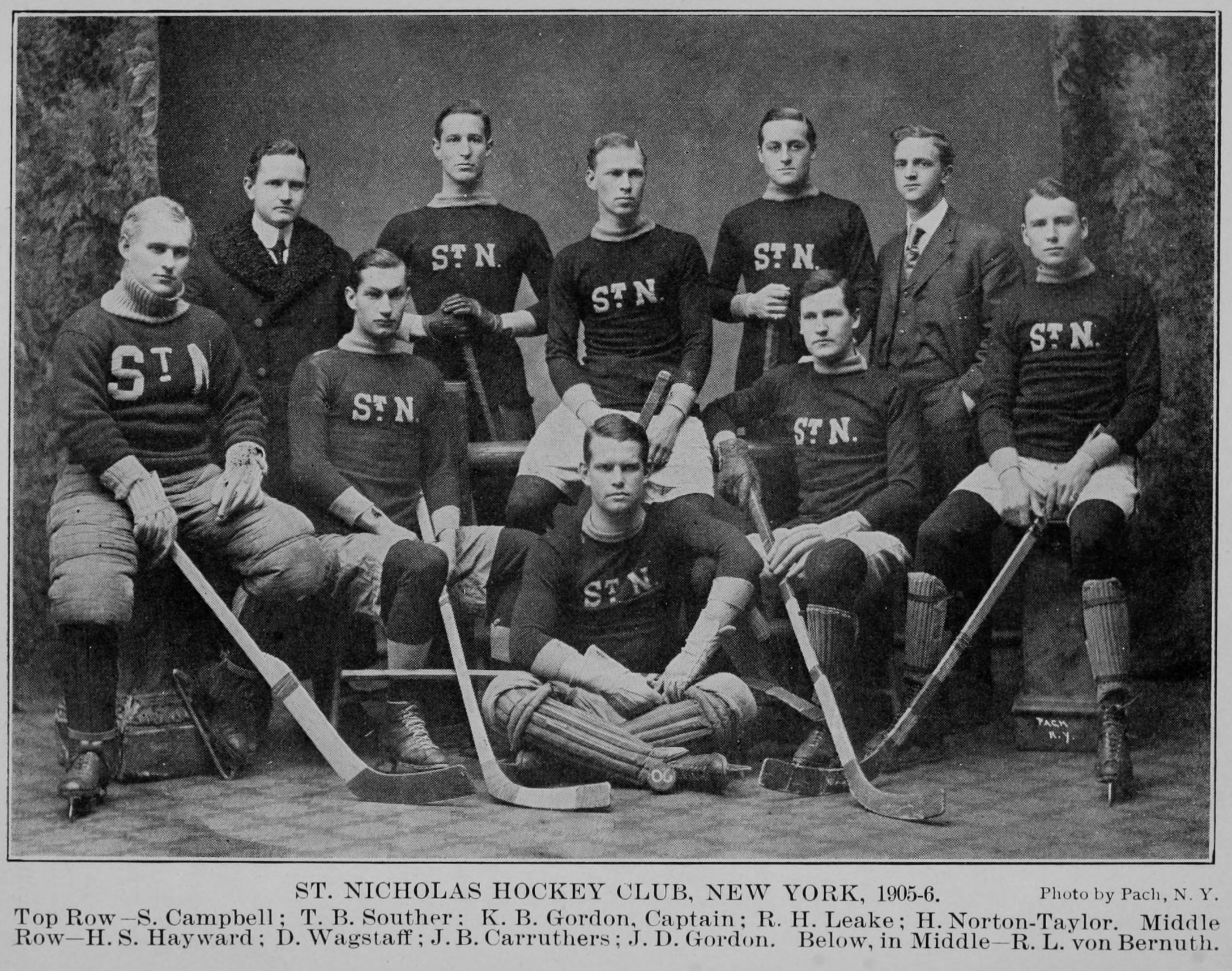
St. Nicholas Hockey Club in 1905–06, revived after having been out of the AAHL the two prior seasons.

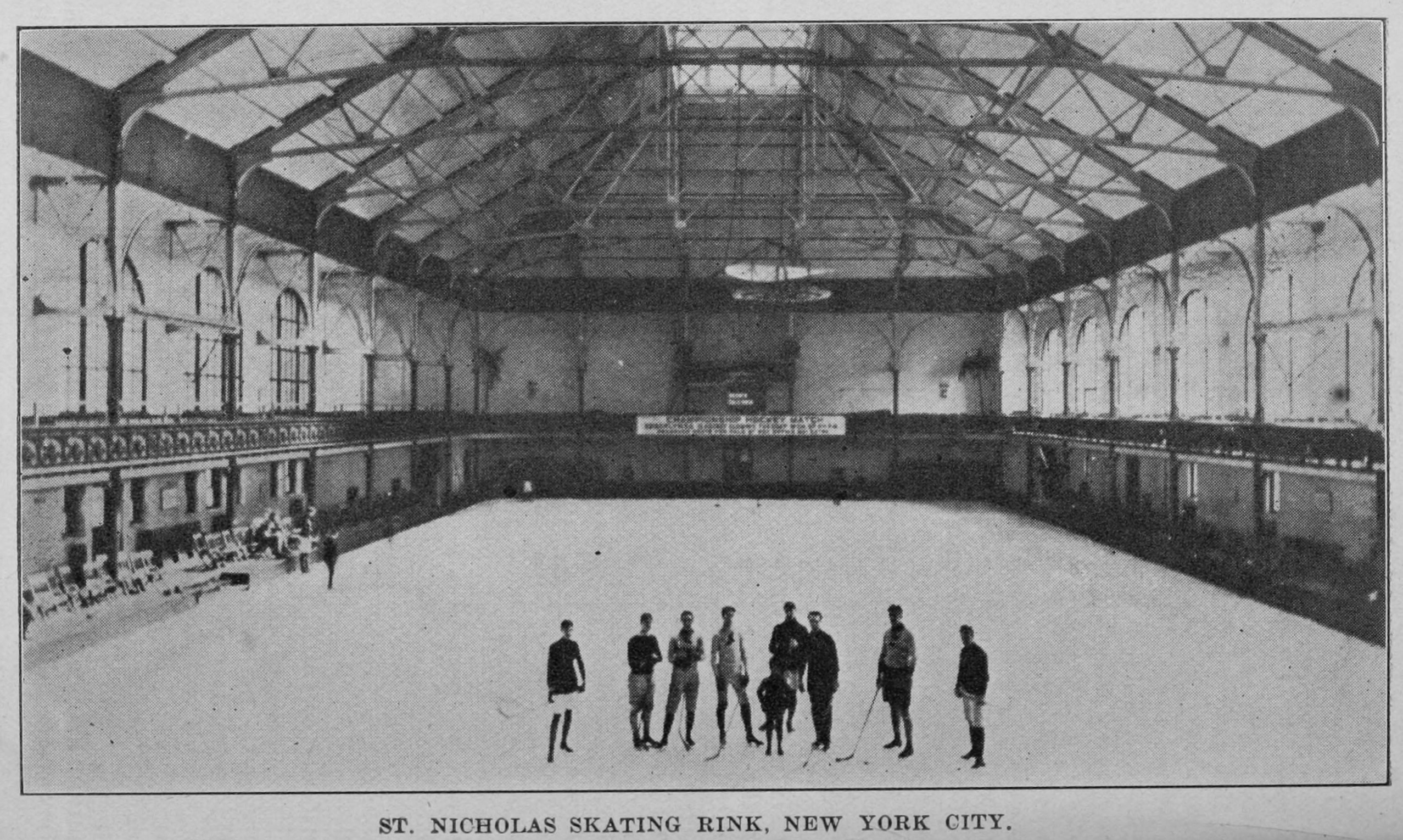
St. Nicholas Skating Rink, home arena of the St. Nicholas Hockey Club.

The St. Nicholas Hockey Club is an ice hockey club from Manhattan, New York City. St. Nicholas Hockey Club played in the American Amateur Hockey League between 1896–1903 and 1905–1918 and won three championship titles, in 1907, 1914 and 1915.

Between 1920–1923 the club played in the United States Amateur Hockey Association.

== History ==
The St. Nicholas Hockey Club was an inaugural member of the American Amateur Hockey League (AAHL) for the 1896–97 season alongside the New York Athletic Club, the Brooklyn Crescents and the Brooklyn Skating Club. The St. Nicholas Hockey Club aggregation for the 1896–97 season consisted of several notable American tennis players such as William Larned, Henry Slocum, Malcolm Chace and Robert Wrenn.

Team captain Ken Gordon and goaltender Harold Hayward joined with four players from the New York Athletic Club to form the New York Wanderers prior to the 1903–04 AAHL season, and during the 1903–04 and 1904–05 AAHL seasons the St. Nicholas Hockey Club was not represented in the league.

Famous American sportsman Hobey Baker, who was inducted into the Hockey Hall of Fame in 1945, played two seasons with the St. Nicholas Hockey Club in the AAHL between 1914 and 1916.
