= Sprague Cleghorn =

Canadian ice hockey player (1890–1956)

- Hockey Hall of Fame, 1958
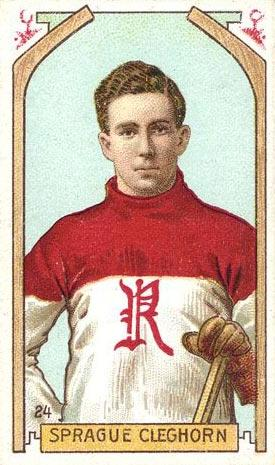
- Cleghorn displayed on a 1911 C55 Imperial Tobacco hockey card
- Born: March 11, 1890 Montreal, Quebec, Canada
- Died: July 12, 1956 (aged 66) Montreal, Quebec, Canada
- Height: 5 ft 10 in (178 cm)
- Weight: 190 lb (86 kg; 13 st 8 lb)
- Position: Defence
- Shot: Left
- Played for: Renfrew Hockey Club; Montreal Wanderers; Ottawa Senators; Toronto St. Patricks; Montreal Canadiens; Boston Bruins; Newark Bulldogs
- Playing career: 1909–1929

Henry William Sprague "Peg" Cleghorn (March 11, 1890 – July 12, 1956), also known as "The Big Train", was a Canadian professional ice hockey player from Westmount, Quebec who played 17 professional seasons between 1911 and 1929 for the Renfrew Creamery Kings and Montreal Wanderers in the National Hockey Association (NHA) and the Ottawa Senators, Montreal Canadiens and Boston Bruins in the National Hockey League (NHL). He was a member of three Stanley Cup championship teams, winning with the Senators in 1920 and 1921 as well as with the Canadiens in 1924. His brother Odie was also a professional player, and the two played several seasons together.

A tough and physical defenceman, Cleghorn had a reputation for violent play; he was twice charged with assault following on-ice incidents and was subject to efforts to have him banned from the NHL. His reputation made him an effective defender, and he used his offensive skill to become one of hockey's first offensive defencemen. At the time of his retirement, Cleghorn's 169 career goals were second most in professional hockey history by a defenceman, behind Harry Cameron's 173. He was inducted into the Hockey Hall of Fame in 1958.

== Early playing career ==
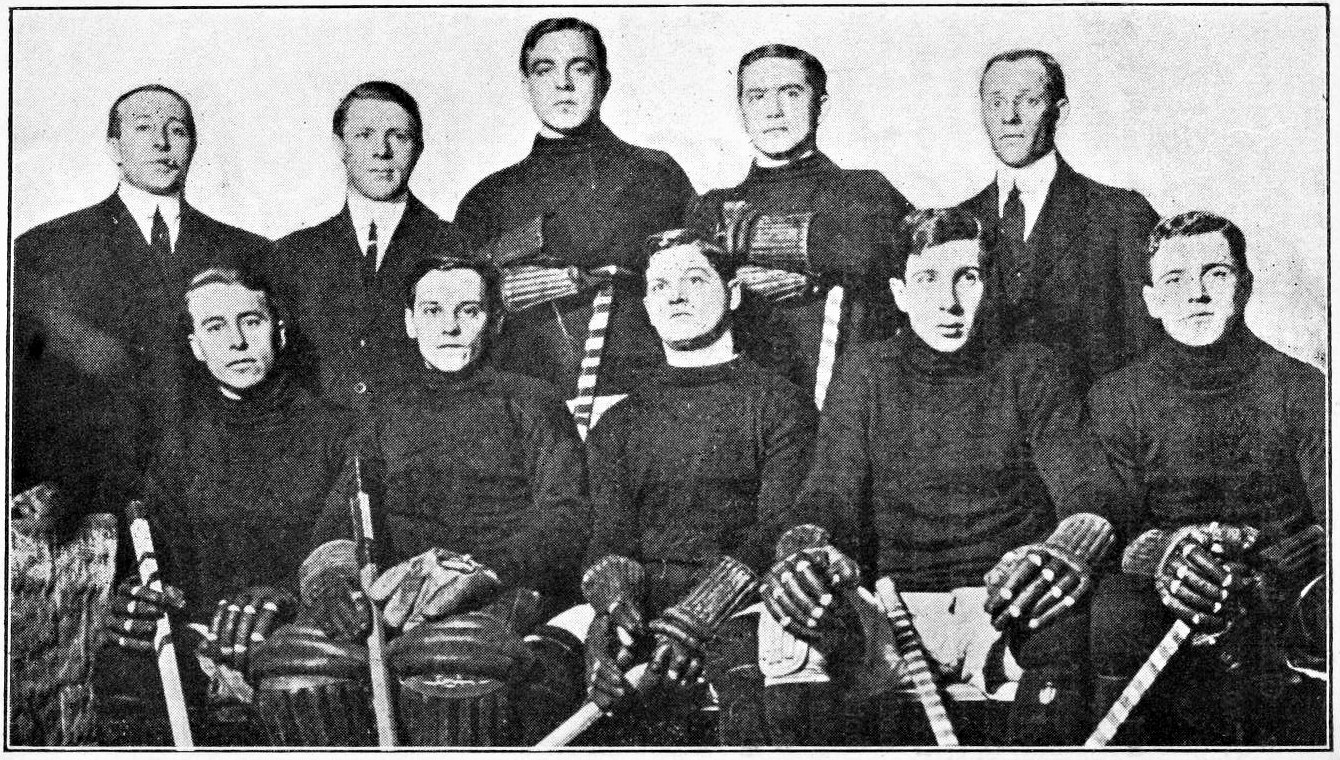
Cleghorn, second from right in the front row, with the 1910 New York Wanderers, with brother Odie seated far right.

Cleghorn was born in the Westmount area of Montreal in 1890, to William John and Harriet Isabella (née Ogilvie) Cleghorn. He attended Westmount Academy and played on junior and amateur Montreal Westmount teams until 1909. In the 1909–10 season, he played for the New York Wanderers of the American Amateur Hockey League and scored seven goals in eight games from the center forward position. He was scouted by the Renfrew Creamery Kings of the National Hockey Association (NHA) and signed a contract, along with his brother Odie, to play with them for the 1910–11 NHA season. Sprague appeared in 12 games, scored five goals and registered 27 penalty minutes. During the season, he switched from winger to defence, as his coach, Alf Smith, felt his presence was better in that position. Cleghorn enjoyed rushing the puck forward and developed into an offensive defenceman.

The Cleghorn brothers moved to the Montreal Wanderers in 1911–12, where they spent the next six seasons. With the Wanderers, he established a reputation as a fierce competitor with an explosive temper. He was also an offensive leader for the Wanderers. Cleghorn frequently carried the puck the length of the ice surface to generate scoring chances: in one game in 1913, he scored five goals against the Toronto Ontarios, and during the 1914–15 season, he led the NHA with 12 assists and also scored 21 goals. Cleghorn would often retaliate violently against opposing players he felt were taking liberties on his teammates, especially his brother Odie. Once, in 1912, he struck opponent Newsy Lalonde in the back of his head after the latter had cross-checked Odie. For this, he was fined and suspended from the league. He also faced a charge of aggravated assault for which he paid a $50 fine. In a January 1917 game against the Toronto Blueshirts, Cleghorn collided with Ken Randall and crashed feet first into the boards. He sustained a broken ankle that ended his season. While recovering from his injury later in 1917, Cleghorn suffered another fall while walking an icy street in Montreal and fractured his other ankle. The injuries forced him to miss the entire 1917–18 season, and cast doubts on his future in hockey.

== NHL career ==
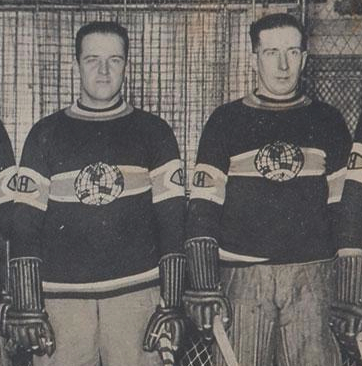
Cleghorn c. 1924 (right) playing for the Canadiens with his brother (left)

After the Montreal Arena burned down in 1918, Cleghorn's rights were claimed in a dispersion draft of the Wanderers team by Ottawa Senators general manager Tommy Gorman, who paid for Cleghorn's transportation to Ottawa. After recovering from his leg injury, he played for the Senators in 1918–19 and registered 13 points in 18 games. The next season, he played in a defensive pair with Eddie Gerard and scored 21 points in 21 regular season games and one point in five playoff games. That season, the Senators defeated the Seattle Metropolitans to win the Stanley Cup. In an attempt at league parity, the NHL transferred him to the Hamilton Tigers in December 1920, but Cleghorn refused to report to the Tigers. The Senators asked that he be allowed to return to their team, for which George Kennedy, owner of the Montreal Canadiens, threatened to have Ottawa thrown out of the league. Cleghorn eventually signed with the Toronto St. Patricks, playing with them for the regular season in which the team won the NHL's second half championship. As the management became discontented with his play, he was eventually released from the club in March after the St. Pats lost the play-offs. He returned to Ottawa during their playoff series in time to be a member of the 1921 Stanley Cup-winning team. The league again attempted to transfer Cleghorn to Hamilton in 1921, but he again refused to report. Just before the start of the 1921–22 NHL season, Hamilton traded him to the Montreal Canadiens for Harry Mummery and Amos Arbour.

On the Canadiens, Cleghorn was reunited with his brother, Odie. In his first season with his new team, he scored 17 goals and had nine assists in 24 games. Towards the end of the season, he was named captain of the team. The Canadiens made the Stanley Cup playoffs every year over the next three seasons. He played alongside Billy Coutu, and the pair established a reputation as one of the most feared defensive pairs in the league. On Jan. 14, 1922, Sprague and Odie each scored 4 goals in a 10–6 victory for the Montreal Canadiens over the Hamilton Tigers. In a 1923 playoff series, against his former team, the Ottawa Senators (whom he had grown to despise), Cleghorn struck Senators defenceman Lionel Hitchman in the head with his stick. He was charged with aggravated assault, found guilty, and fined $50. The incident enraged Canadiens owner Leo Dandurand, who suspended him from the roster for the remainder of the playoffs. In another incident with the Senators in 1922, he initiated a brawl during which he injured three players, Eddie Gerard, Frank Nighbor, and Cy Denneny. The Ottawa management attempted to have him expelled from the league, and a referee described him as a "disgrace to the game". In 1923–24, the Canadiens won their first Stanley Cup in the NHL. It was the third championship of Cleghorn's career. After the following season, Montreal sold him to the Boston Bruins for $5000. He played three seasons with the Bruins and acted as their unofficial captain. In his final season with the Bruins, 1927–28, he also served as an assistant coach. During his time in Boston, he served as a veteran presence on the team and as a mentor to future Hall of Fame defenceman Eddie Shore.

== Post-retirement career ==
After his retirement as a player, Cleghorn took to coaching. He joined the Newark Bulldogs of the Canadian-American Hockey League (CAHL) as a player-manager from 1928 to 1929. During this time, he acquired his former Montreal teammate, Billy Coutu, to serve as his defensive partner. A newspaper at the time stated that the move "reunit[ed] the most formidable defence that ever played hockey". In the 1930–31 season, he coached the CAHL's Providence Reds, and in 1931–32 he was named head coach of the NHL's Montreal Maroons. That season, the Maroons racked up 19 wins and 22 losses, finished third in the Canadian Division and made the Stanley Cup playoffs. The team was eliminated in the semifinals by the eventual champions, the Toronto Maple Leafs.

Cleghorn was hired in 1935 by the Pittsburgh Shamrocks of the International Hockey League (IHL), but was fired by the team near the end of the season over a dispute with club president Ray Babcock over the payment of his salary. He was replaced by Albert Hughes, the team's captain, for their 11 remaining games. According to media reports, Cleghorn refused to leave with the team for a game in Windsor because he claimed that the team had not been paid three days earlier. However, the Shamrocks' ownership stated that the reason Cleghorn did not accompany the Shamrocks team on their trip was because he had to be disciplined for "misconduct covering the past month". On March 14, 1936, Cleghorn filed a lawsuit against the Shamrocks' ownership, claiming that he was owed $420.50 in salary since March 2 and a $1,000 bonus, as per his contract. His final coaching stint was with the Cornwall Cougars of the Quebec Provincial Hockey League. He was appointed to the position September 30, 1947, and served for a little over a month. After his team went winless in their first six games and having just suffered an 11–0 defeat at home, he was fired on November 14.

== Playing style ==
Known for both his intense competitive nature and violent temper, Cleghorn was considered one of the toughest and dirtiest players of his time. Respected by his teammates and hated by his opponents, Cleghorn often used his stick as a weapon and was routinely among his team's leaders in both goals and penalty minutes. He claimed to have been involved in at least fifty incidents during his career in which a player left the ice on a stretcher. In the season when Ottawa unsuccessfully attempted to have him banned from the NHL, Cleghorn led the league in penalty minutes with 80. According to some accounts, Evelyn Byng, Viscountess Byng of Vimy, was so mortified by Cleghorn's style that she donated the Lady Byng Trophy to the NHL in 1924 in a bid to encourage more sportsmanlike play.

Cleghorn's physicality made him a feared defender away from the puck, and he was regarded as one of his era's top defencemen. His ability to rush the puck forward also made him a scoring threat; Cleghorn was one of hockey's first offensive defencemen. He once scored five goals in an NHA game in 1913, and had a career best 21 goals in 19 games in 1914–15. He retired in 1928 with 169 career goals, at the time the second most by a defenceman in professional hockey history, behind only Harry Cameron. The Hockey News ranked Cleghorn as the 88th greatest player of all-time in its 1998 book, The Top 100 NHL players of All-Time. He was inducted into the Hockey Hall of Fame in 1958.

== Personal life ==
On May 8, 1911 in New York, Cleghorn married Evelyn Irene Mabie, whom he had met while playing with the Wanderers. He was arrested in 1918 for beating his wife with a crutch while he was recovering from his ankle injuries. The couple divorced in 1921, after Cleghorn was found by his wife with another woman after she had reported him as missing. He was ordered by a judge to pay alimony of $1,000 per month to his ex-wife. Cleghorn later remarried twice, with his second marriage also ending in divorce. His third wife, Vivian Goudreau, predeceased him on December 18, 1943.

Cleghorn was hit by a motorist on his way to work on June 29, 1956, on Commissioners Street in Montreal. He sustained head injuries and a fractured cervical vertebrae. Two weeks later, on July 12, 1956, he died of his injuries at St. Luc Hospital. He was 66 and was survived by his brother Odie and three sisters. His funeral was held at First Presbyterian Church in Montreal on July 14 and he was buried at Mount Royal Cemetery. Upon his death, his brother, Odie, remarked, "He was my brother, and I don't like to boast, but I never saw a tougher or better defenceman than Sprague." Two days later, Odie died in his sleep of heart failure and was found by his sister just hours before Sprague's funeral.

== Career statistics ==
=== Regular season and playoffs ===
			Regular season					Playoffs
Season	Team	League	GP	G	A	Pts	PIM	GP	G	A	Pts	PIM
1908–09	Montreal Canadian Rubber	MCHL	3	1	0	1	10	—	—	—	—	—
1909–10	New York Wanderers	AAHL	8	7	0	7	—	—	—	—	—	—
1910–11	Renfrew Creamery Kings	NHA	12	5	0	5	27	—	—	—	—	—
1911–12	Montreal Wanderers	NHA	18	9	0	9	40	—	—	—	—	—
1911–12	NHA All-Stars	Exh.	3	0	0	0	0	—	—	—	—	—
1912–13	Montreal Wanderers	NHA	19	12	0	12	46	—	—	—	—	—
1912–13	NHA All-Stars	Exh.	5	0	0	0	6	—	—	—	—	—
1913–14	Montreal Wanderers	NHA	20	12	8	20	17	—	—	—	—	—
1914–15	Montreal Wanderers	NHA	19	21	12	33	51	2	0	0	0	17
1915–16	Montreal Wanderers	NHA	8	9	4	13	22	—	—	—	—	—
1916–17	Montreal Wanderers	NHA	19	16	9	25	62	—	—	—	—	—
1918–19	Ottawa Senators	NHL	18	7	6	13	27	5	2	1	3	9
1919–20	Ottawa Senators	NHL	21	16	5	21	85	—	—	—	—	—
1919–20	Ottawa Senators	St-Cup	—	—	—	—	—	5	0	1	1	4
1920–21	Toronto St. Pats	NHL	13	3	5	8	31	1	0	0	0	0
1920–21	Ottawa Senators	St-Cup	—	—	—	—	—	5	1	2	3	38
1921–22	Montreal Canadiens	NHL	24	17	9	26	80	—	—	—	—	—
1922–23	Montreal Canadiens	NHL	24	9	8	17	34	1	0	0	0	7
1923–24	Montreal Canadiens	NHL	23	8	4	12	45	2	0	0	0	0
1923–24	Montreal Canadiens	St-Cup	—	—	—	—	—	4	2	1	3	2
1924–25	Montreal Canadiens	NHL	27	8	10	18	89	2	1	2	3	2
1924–25	Montreal Canadiens	St-Cup	—	—	—	—	—	4	0	0	0	2
1925–26	Boston Bruins	NHL	28	6	5	11	49	—	—	—	—	—
1926–27	Boston Bruins	NHL	44	7	1	8	84	8	1	0	1	8
1927–28	Boston Bruins	NHL	37	2	2	4	14	2	0	0	0	0
1928–29	Newark Bulldogs	Can-Am	3	0	0	0	0	—	—	—	—	—
NHA totals			115	84	33	117	265	2	0	0	0	17
NHL totals			259	83	55	138	538	21	3	4	7	26
St-Cup totals			—	—	—	—	—	18	3	4	7	46

=== Coaching career ===
Team	Year	Regular season						Postseason
Team	Year	G	W	L	T	Pts	Division rank	Result
Montreal Maroons	1931–32	48	19	22	7	45	3rd in Canadian	Lost in semi-finals

== Awards and honours ==
Career
Award	Year	Ref.
Stanley Cup champion	1919–20, 1920–21; 1923–24	

== See also ==
- Violence in ice hockey
- List of members of the Hockey Hall of Fame

== Bibliography ==
- Conner, Floyd (2002), Hockey's Most Wanted: The Top 10 Book of Wicked Slapshots, Bruising Goons and Ice Oddities, Omaha, Nebraska: Potomac Books, Inc., ISBN 978-1-77090-421-7
- Fischler, Stan; Fischler, Shirley (2003), Who's Who in Hockey, Kansas City, Missouri: Andrews McMeel Publishing, ISBN 978-0-7407-1904-2
- Kennedy, Ryan, ed. (2010), "Blood Feuds: Hockey's Best-Ever Rivalries", The Hockey News, Transcontinental Books, ISBN 978-0-9813938-1-0
- Holzman, Morley; Nieforth, Joseph (2002), Deceptions and Doublecross: How the NHL Conquered Hockey, Toronto, Ontario: Dundurn Press, ISBN 978-1-55002-413-5
- Leonetti, Greg (2004), Canadiens Legends: Montreal's Hockey Heroes, Vancouver, British Columbia: Raincoast Books, ISBN 978-1-55192-731-2
- Oliver, Greg; Kamchen, Richard (2013), Don't Call Me Goon: Hockey's Greatest Enforcers, Gunslingers, and Bad Boys, Toronto, Ontario: ECW Press, ISBN 978-1-77090-421-7

Preceded by Newsy Lalonde	Montreal Canadiens captain 1922–25	Succeeded by Billy Coutu
Preceded by no captain	Boston Bruins captain 1925–28	Succeeded by Lionel Hitchman
Preceded by Georges Boucher	Head coach of the Montreal Maroons; 1931–32	Succeeded by Eddie Gerard
