= LeRoy See =

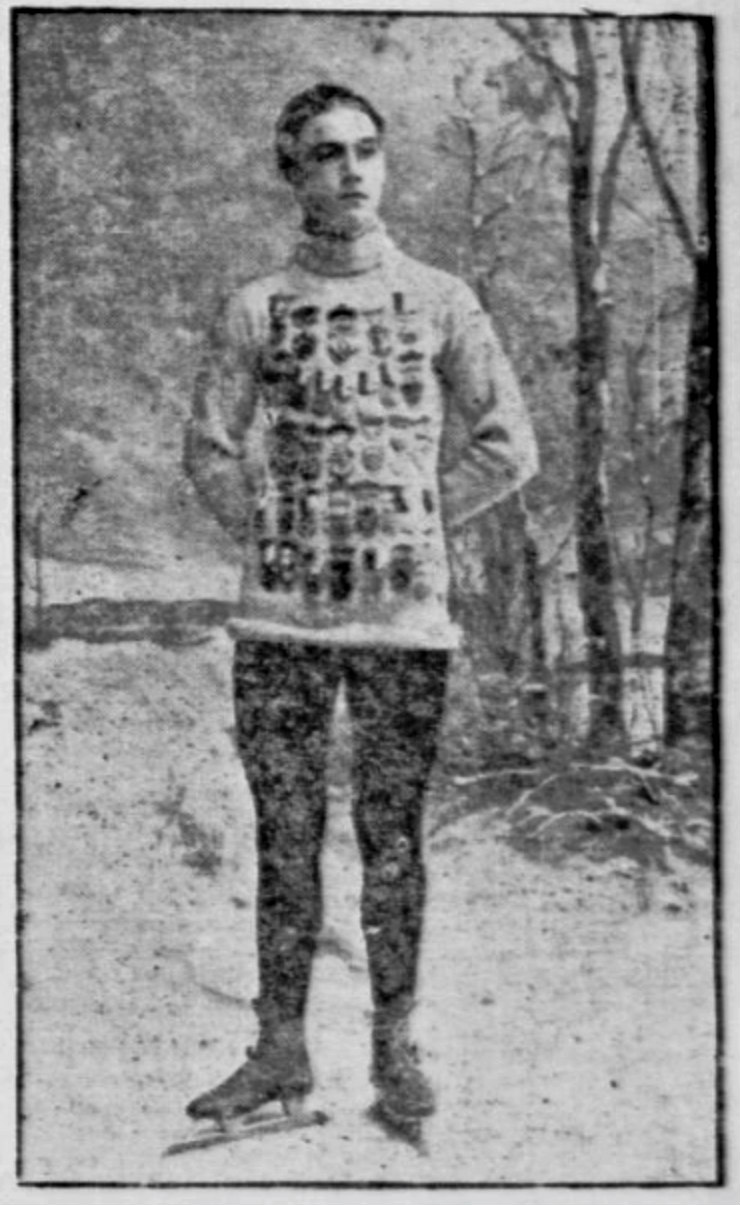

Personal information
- Born: New York City, New York, USA
- Died: 19 June 1922 New York City, New York, USA

Sport
- Sport: Speed skating
- Club: New York Athletic Club

LeRoy Allen See (alternative first name spelling Le Roy) ( – 19 June 1922) was an American amateur speed skater and cyclist active during the first decade of the 20th century.

See held the world's amateur skating record for the 220 yard dash (set in 1900) for over a decade before it was broken by Edmund Lamy.

See died on 19 June 1922, at St. Bartholomew's Hospital in New York City following an operation.
