= New York Wanderers =

Amateur ice hockey team

- City: New York City, New York; USA
- League: American Amateur Hockey League; 1903–1905; 1907–1910; 1911–12; 1913–14; United States National Hockey League; 1917–18
- Colors: Crimson Red, White Red, Green, Blue, White (1909–10)

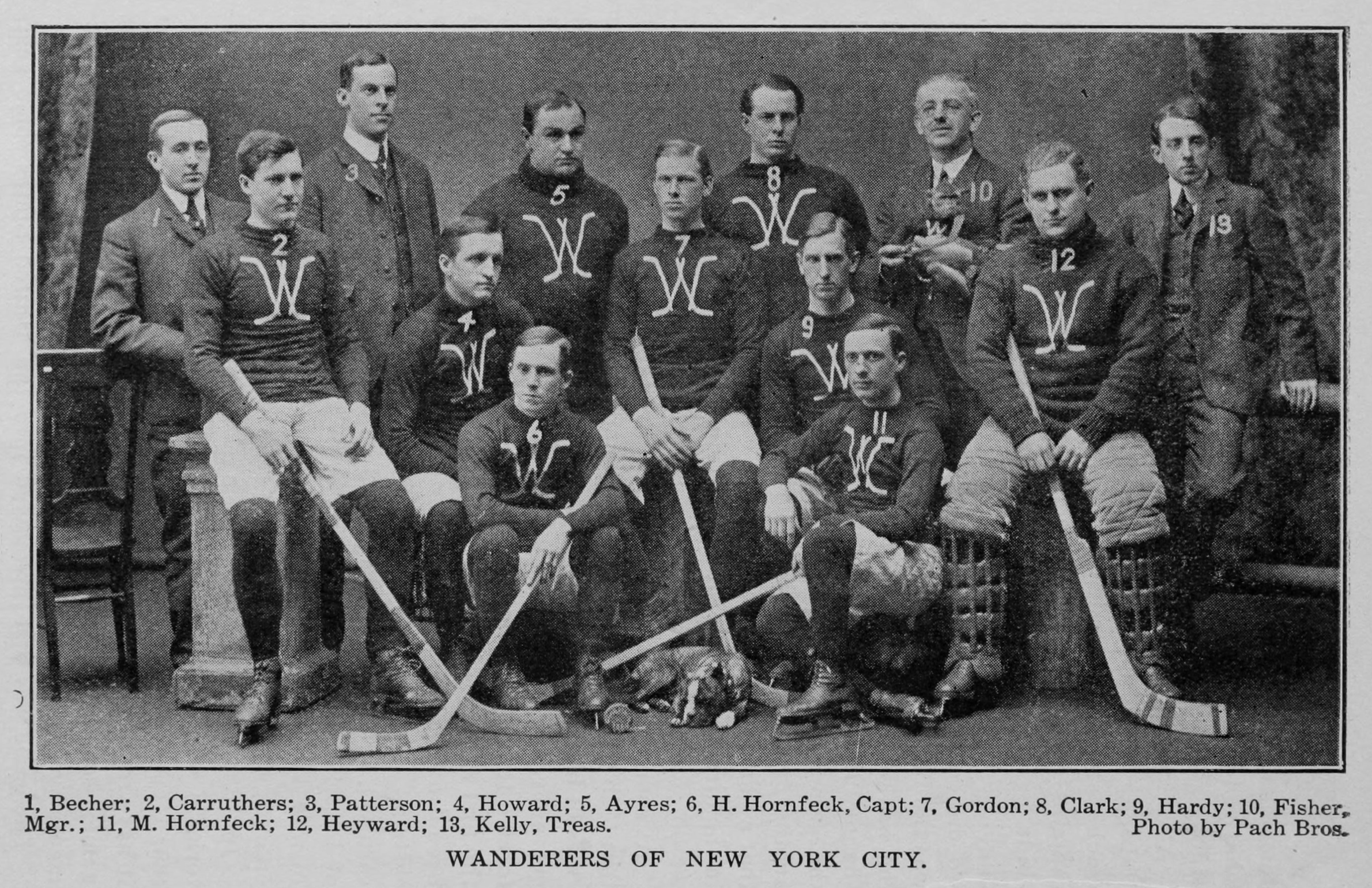
New York Wanderers in 1904.

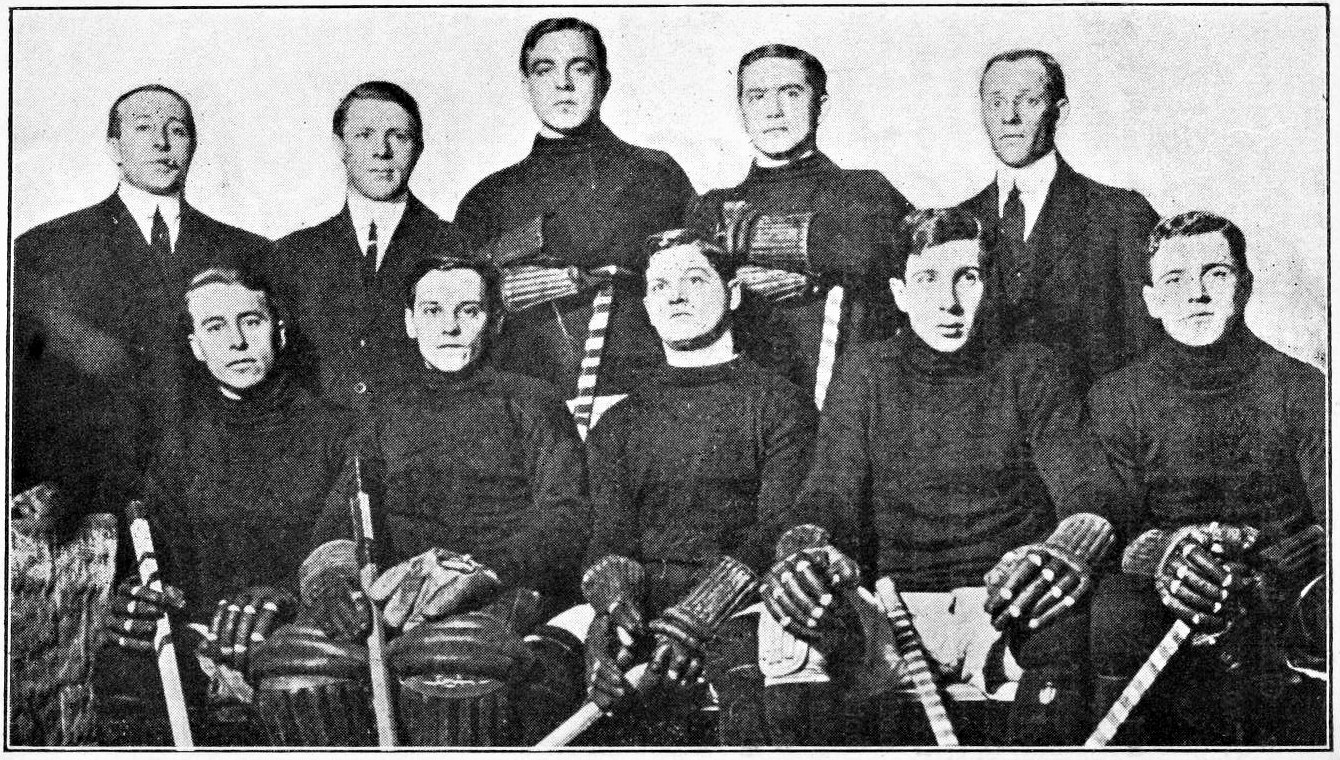
New York Wanderers in 1909–10. Cooper Smeaton is in the middle of the top row. Cleghorn brothers Sprague and Odie are seated at right in the front row.

The New York Wanderers were an amateur ice hockey team from Manhattan, New York City. The New York Wanderers played seven seasons in the American Amateur Hockey League between 1903 and 1914 and won the championship title in 1903–04.

1896 Stanley Cup champion (with the Winnipeg Victorias) Tom Howard played with the Wanderers in 1903–04 & 1904–05 and helped the team win a league championship title in 1904.

== History ==
The New York Wanderers formed prior to the 1903–04 AAHL season when four of the best players (Tom Howard, Max Hornfeck, Charlie Clarke and Jack Carruthers) on the New York Athletic Club deserted the team and joined with St. Nicholas Hockey Club players Ken Gordon and Harold Hayward to start a new aggregation. The Wanderers took the place of the St. Nicholas Hockey Club in the AAHL for the 1903–04 season (although the St. Nicholas HC would be back in the AAHL for the 1905–06 season).

Sprague Cleghorn, inducted into the Hockey Hall of Fame in 1958, and his brother Odie Cleghorn played for the New York Wanderers in the 1909–10 season. Cooper Smeaton (referee-in-chief in the NHL from 1917 until 1937 and a Hockey Hall of Fame member) was also a member of the 1909–10 Wanderers team.

John McGrath, secretary and political advisor to Theodore Roosevelt between 1912 and 1916, was a member of the club in 1911–12.

In their later years, the Wanderers fell out of favor with the AAHL by causing what The New York Times called "certain unpleasantness and several breaches of the rules". They were induced to withdraw from the league in 1914.

The club was reorganized in late 1917 with the plan of playing weekly exhibition matches against teams from other cities in the United States and Canada. Starting the following January, the Wanderers participated in the only season of the United States National Hockey League, finishing third among four teams. The club disbanded in the offseason after losing nearly all of its players to military service.
