= New York Hockey Club =

- City: Manhattan, New York City; USA
- League: American Amateur Hockey League, 1897–1918
- Founded: 1895
- Home arena: Ice Palace Skating Rink; St. Nicholas Skating Rink
- Colors: Black, White (1897–98); Red, Gray (1898–1917)
- Head coach: Tom Howard (1912–13)
- Captain: Sam Phillips (1898–99); Billy Russell (?–1910); Jimmy Britton (1910–11)

The New York Hockey Club, also known as the Hockey Club of New York, was an amateur ice hockey team from Manhattan in New York City. The New York Hockey Club played in the American Amateur Hockey League between 1897 and 1917 and won one championship title, in the 1912–13 season. Canadian ice hockey player Tom "Attie" Howard coached the 1912–13 team.

The New York Hockey Club first played its home games at the Ice Palace Skating Rink, and later on at the St. Nicholas Skating Rink.

== History ==
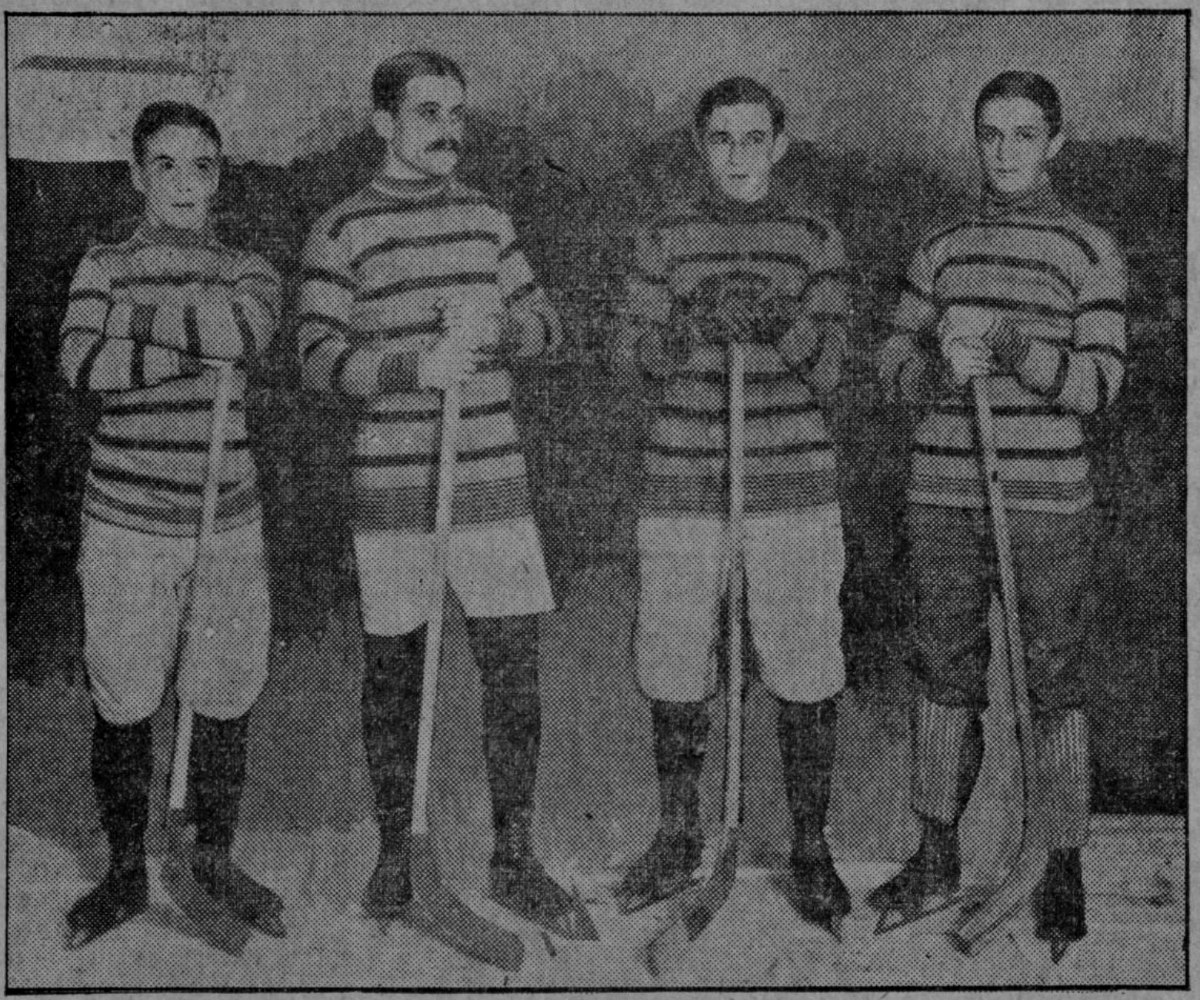
New York HC players in 1899–1900, left to right: Billy Russell, Sam Phillips, Benny Phillips and Charles DeCasanova.

The New York Hockey Club was formed in the mid-1890s by a group of Canadians, mostly from Montreal but among them also Arthur Davies Knowlson (1870–1922) from Lindsay, Ontario. During the 1895–96 season the team played non-league exhibition games in New York City, their home games at the Ice Palace Skating Rink at 107th Street and Lexington Avenue in Manhattan.

When the American Amateur Hockey League was launched for the 1896–97 season seven players (among them Jim Fenwick, Beverley Bogert and goaltender Gerald MacRae) on the team jumped ship and instead joined the hockey team of the New York Athletic Club in the AAHL. Arthur Knowlson stayed with the club and gathered the remaining players (most of them from the second team) and during the 1896–97 season the New York HC aggregation played exhibition games with successful results winning 12 games out of 16 and only losing once (1-4 to their old teammates on the New York AC) and drawing three games. The players were still mostly Canadians but the team also figured brothers Sam (b. 1871) and Benny (b. 1875) Phillips from New York City.

The New York Hockey Club joined the AAHL for its second season in 1897–98.

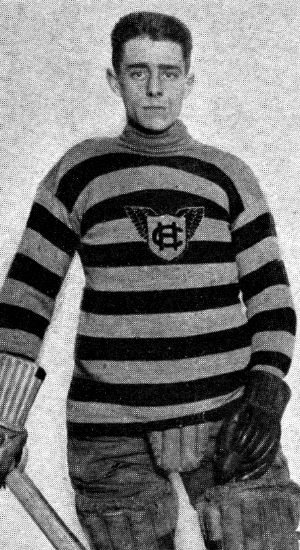
Goaltender Fred Lewis played with the New York HC for five seasons between 1912 and 1917
