= Brooklyn Crescents =

- City: Brooklyn, New York City; USA
- League: American Amateur Hockey League, 1896–97, 1899–1918
- Home arena: Clermont Avenue Skating Rink (1896–1906); St. Nicholas Skating Rink (1906–1916); Brooklyn Ice Palace (1917–1918)
- Colors: Maroon, White

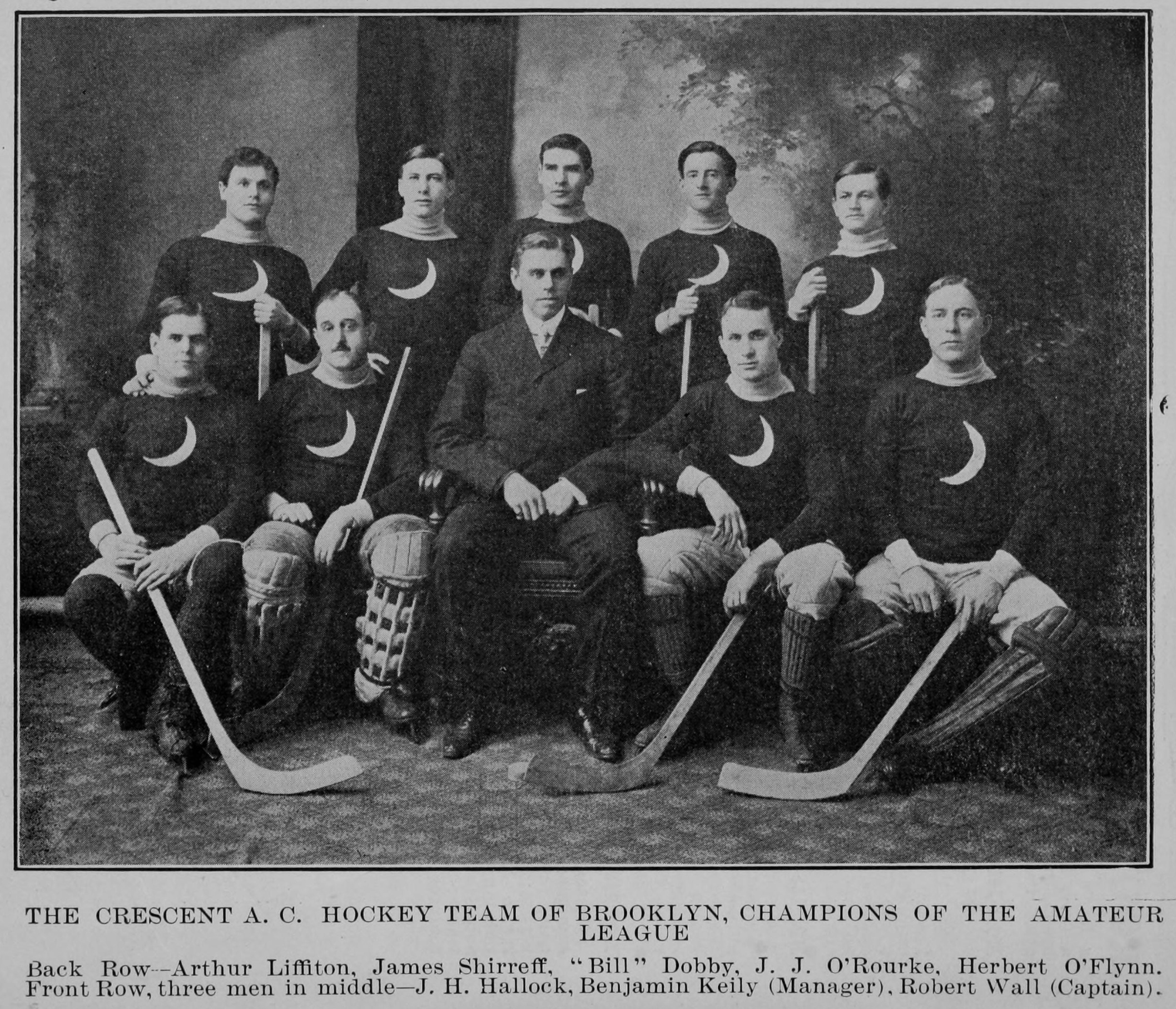
Brooklyn Crescents in 1905–06.

The Brooklyn Crescents, affiliated with the Crescent Athletic Club, were an American amateur ice hockey team from Brooklyn in New York City.

== History ==
The Brooklyn Crescents played in the American Amateur Hockey League in 1896–97 (the inaugural season) and between 1899 and 1918 and won nine championship titles, most in league history. The Crescents had several Canadian players on its team, among them Bob Wall, Bill Dobby and Arthur Liffiton from Montreal, Jimmy Shirreff from Brockville and James Sarsfield Kennedy from Barrie. Wall, Dobby and Kennedy joined the Crescents from the rivaling Brooklyn SC before the 1899–1900 season, while Liffiton joined from the same club for the 1901–02 season. Before moving to New York City both Bob Wall and Bill Dobby had played on the Montreal Shamrocks.

The Brooklyn Crescents played their home games at the Clermont Avenue Skating Rink in Brooklyn, which they shared with fellow AAHL team the Brooklyn Skating Club, from 1896 until 1906. From 1906 to 1916 they played at the St. Nicholas Rink in Manhattan. In January 1917 the team moved its operations to the Brooklyn Ice Palace at the corner of Atlantic Avenue and Bedford Avenue in Brooklyn.
