= American Amateur Hockey League =

- Countries: United States
- Region(s): New York; New Jersey; Massachusetts; Pennsylvania
- Founded: 1896
- First season: 1896–97
- Folded: 1917
- Most successful club: Brooklyn Crescents (9)

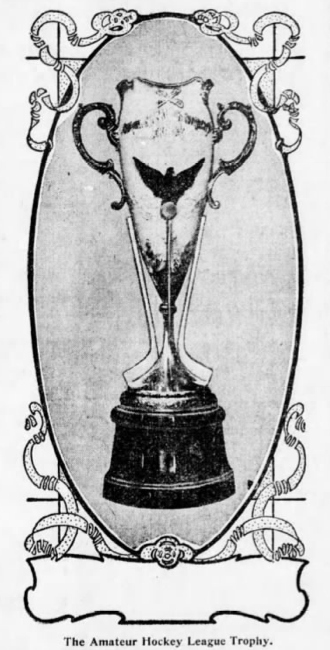
Championship trophy of the league.

The American Amateur Hockey League was an amateur ice hockey league in the United States. The league was founded in 1896, and was based in New York City and New Jersey, until 1914, when the Boston AA joined the league. In the 1900–01 season a team from Philadelphia, the Quaker City Hockey Club, also played in the AAHL. The league ceased operations after the 1916–17 season.

== Players ==
Hobey Baker, famous American athlete and inducted into the Hockey Hall of Fame in 1945, played two seasons in the league for the St. Nicholas Hockey Club between 1914 and 1916. Sprague Cleghorn, another Hockey Hall of Fame member, spent the 1909–10 season with the New York Wanderers, as did his brother Odie Cleghorn.

During St. Nicholas Hockey Club's inaugural season in the league, in 1896–97, the team was represented by several notable American tennis players, among them William Larned, Henry Slocum, Malcolm Chace and Robert Wrenn. Canadian middle-distance runner and Olympic gold medalist George Orton played for the Quaker City Hockey Club in 1900–01, as did 1906 US Open tennis champion William Clothier.

A great bulk of the players in the AAHL came from different Ivy League schools such as Harvard, Princeton, Columbia and Yale. Among them were United States Senator Leverett Saltonstall and prominent businessman Harold Stanley. The league also had many Canadian players on its teams, among them Tom "Attie" Howard, George Orton, Bob Wall, Bill Dobby, Artie Liffiton and Riley Casselman.

== Teams ==
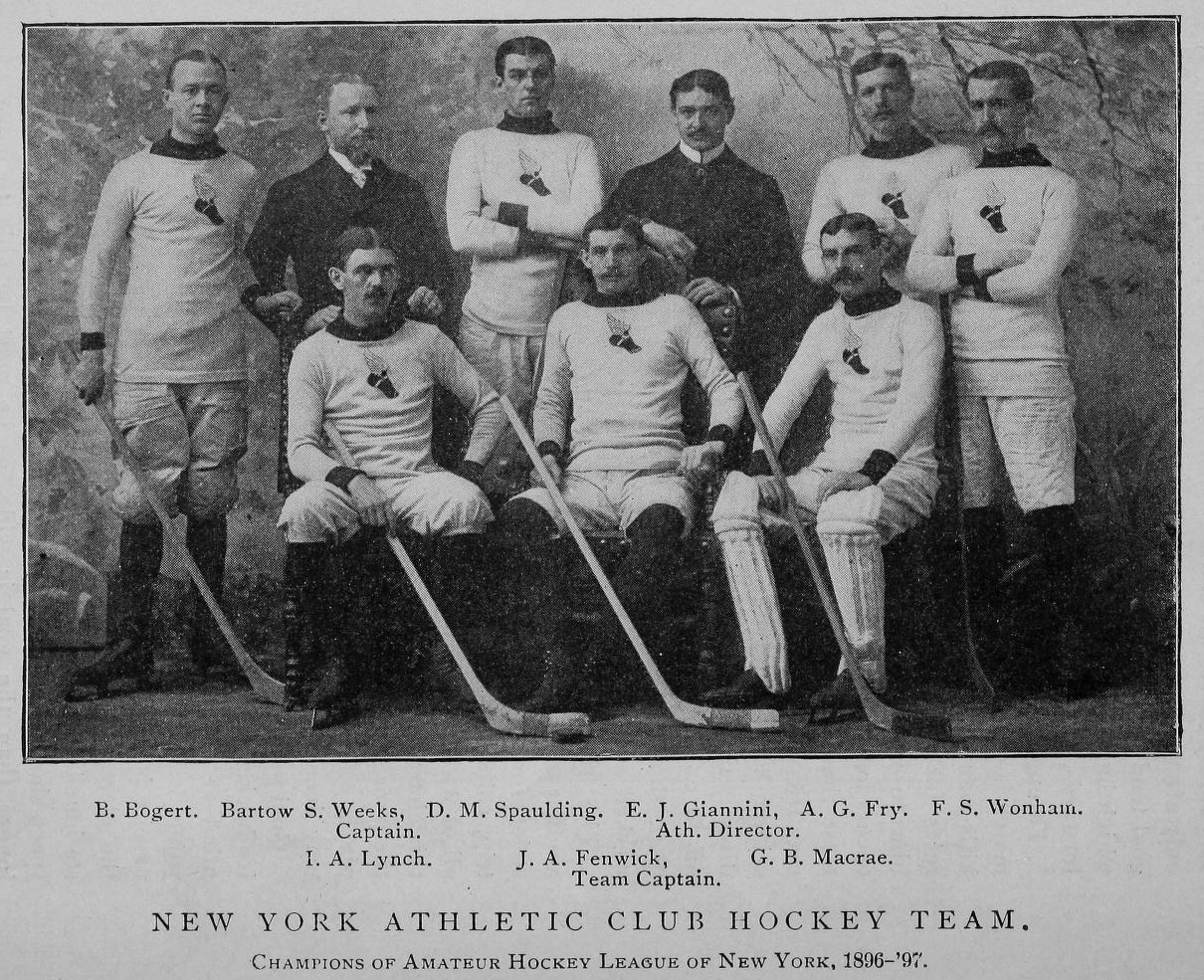
New York Athletic Club in the inaugural 1896–97 season.

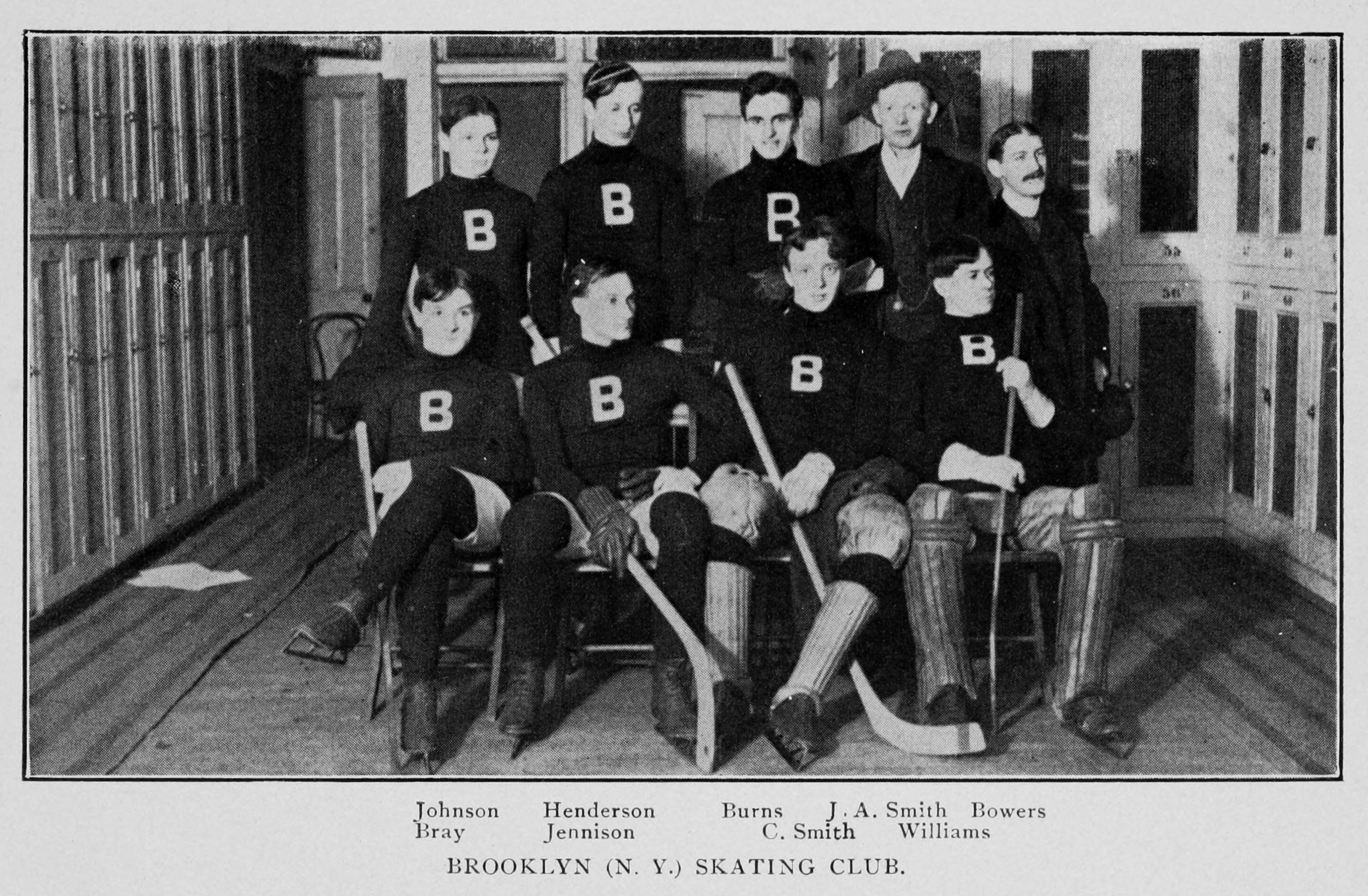
Brooklyn Skating Club in the 1903–04 season.

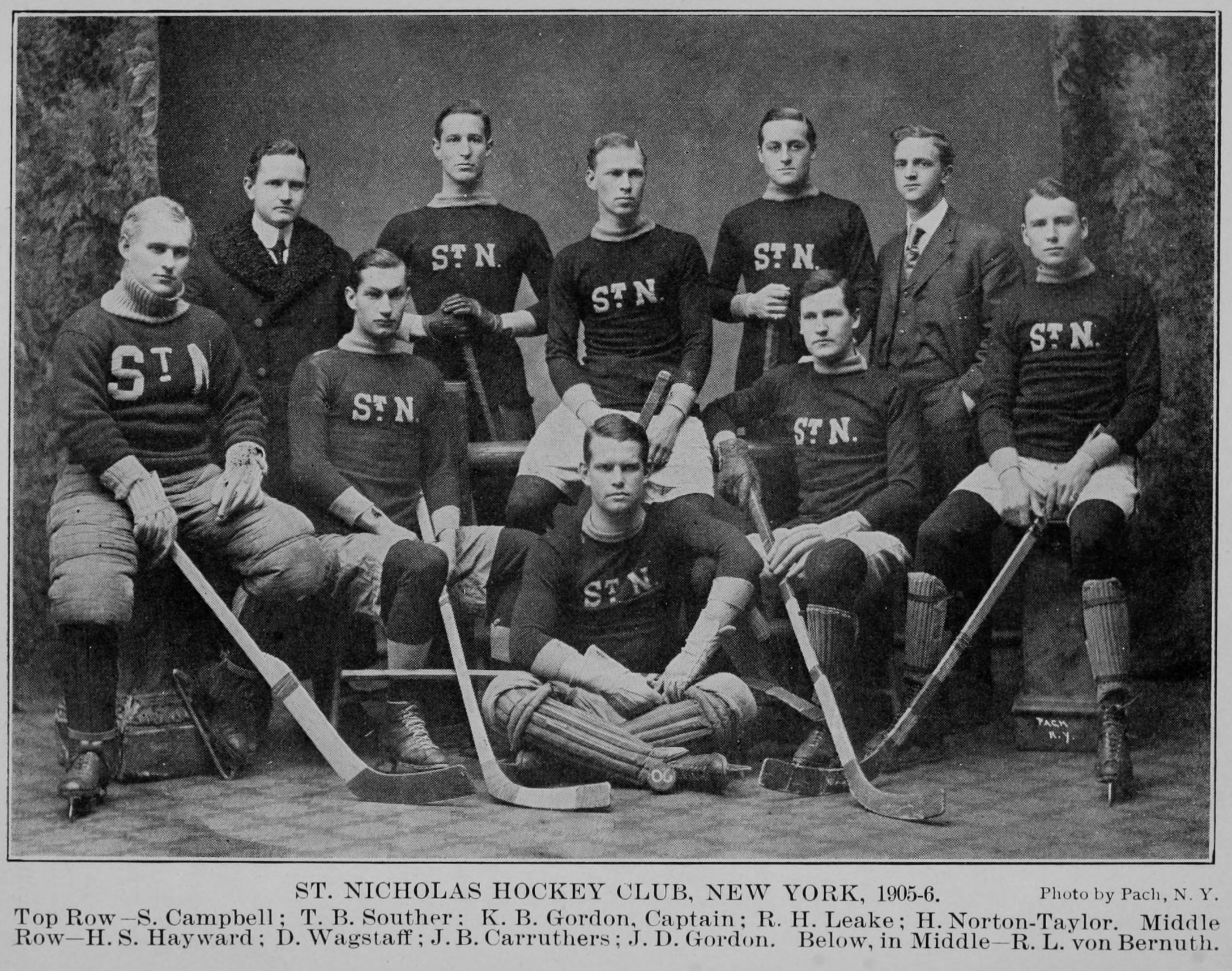
St. Nicholas Hockey Club in 1905–06.

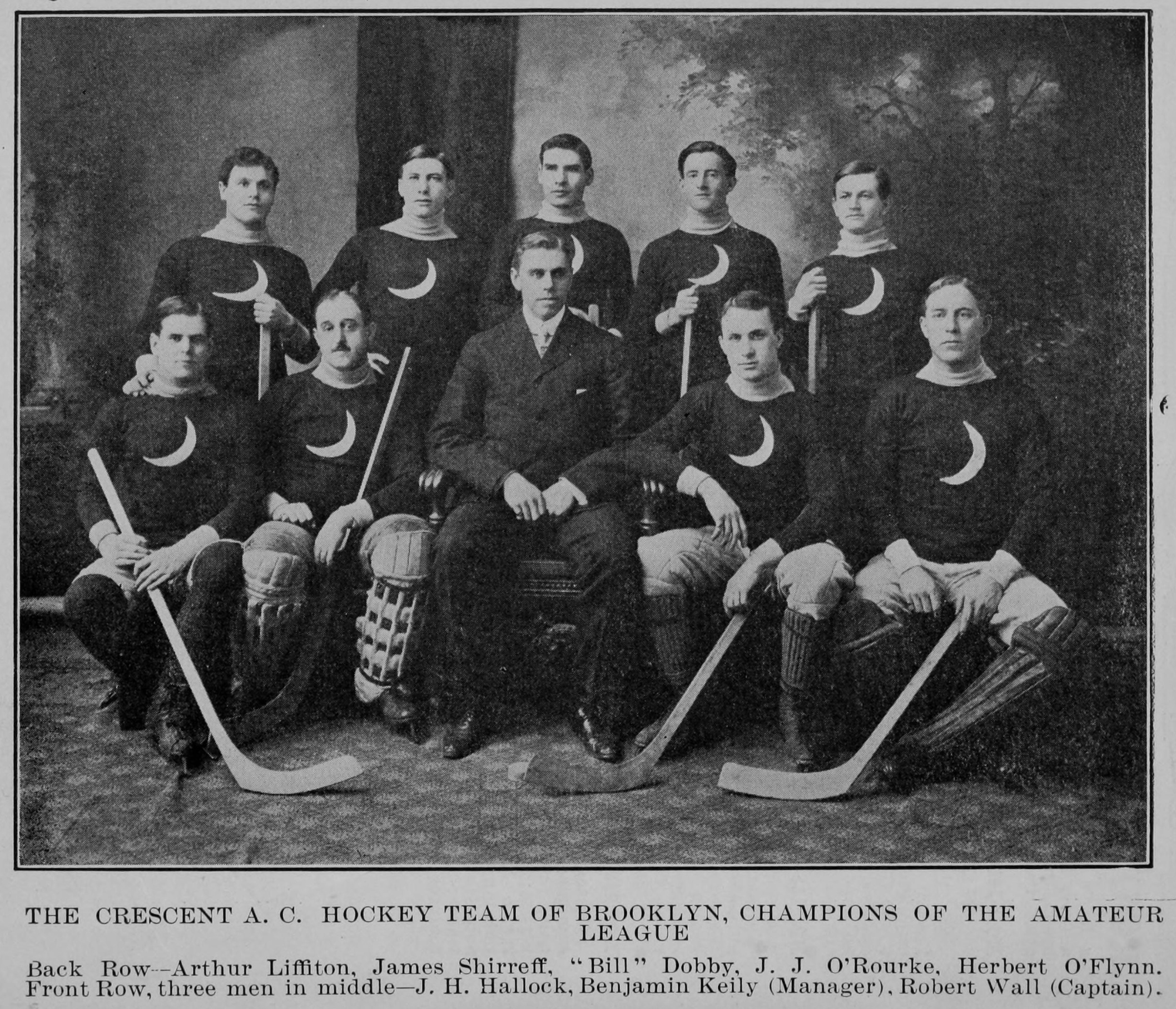
Brooklyn Crescents in 1905–06.

- Crescent Athletic Club, "Brooklyn Crescents", 1896–97, 1899–1917
- Brooklyn Skating Club, 1896–1906
- New York Athletic Club, "Winged Footers" or "Mercury Footers", 1896–1912
- New York Hockey Club, 1897–1917
- New York Wanderers, 1903–1905, 1907–1910, 1911–12, 1913–14
- St. Nicholas Hockey Club, 1896–1903, 1905–1917
- Montclair Athletic Club, New Jersey, 1897–1899
- New York Naval Reserves, 1899–1900
- Quaker City Hockey Club, Philadelphia, 1900–01
- New York Irish-Americans, 1912–1915, 1916–17
- Boston Athletic Association, 1914–1917
- Harvard Club, Boston, 1915–16
- Boston Arena Hockey Club, 1916–17
- Boston Hockey Club, 1916–17

== Champions ==
- 1896–97: New York Athletic Club
- 1897–98: New York Athletic Club
- 1898–99: Brooklyn Skating Club
- 1899–1900: Brooklyn Crescents
- 1900–01: Brooklyn Crescents
- 1901–02: Brooklyn Crescents
- 1902–03: Brooklyn Crescents
- 1903–04: New York Wanderers
- 1904–05: Brooklyn Crescents
- 1905–06: Brooklyn Crescents
- 1906–07: St. Nicholas Hockey Club
- 1907–08: Brooklyn Crescents
- 1908–09: New York Athletic Club
- 1909–10: New York Athletic Club
- 1910–11: Brooklyn Crescents
- 1911–12: Brooklyn Crescents
- 1912–13: New York Hockey Club
- 1913–14: St. Nicholas Hockey Club
- 1914–15: St. Nicholas Hockey Club
- 1915–16: Boston Athletic Association
- 1916–17: Boston Athletic Association
