= List of United States collegiate men's ice hockey seasons =

This is a list of seasons and results of collegiate ice hockey seasons prior the inception of the NCAA tournament in 1947.

== Foundation ==
In 1892, while participating in a tennis tournament at Niagara Falls, Ontario, Malcolm Greene Chace was introduced to the Canadian pastime of ice hockey. While he was attending Yale University, Chace put together a team of fellow collegians from his alma mater as well as Brown, Columbia and Harvard that embarked on a 10-game tour in Canadian cities around southern Quebec and Ontario during the winter of 1894–95. The following year, Chace was able to put together a team of Yale students and organize four games for them to play during the spring semester. The second and third games played by Yale were played against Johns Hopkins University and are credited with being the first two intercollegiate ice hockey games played by American universities.

College ice hockey in the United States predates the existence of any formal governing body but when the precursor to the NCAA was created in 1906 ice hockey was far too regional and new for it to receive much attention. For most of the first half of the 20th century the colleges themselves were allowed to set the terms for which teams they could participate against and who would be declared champion at the end of the season. Prior to the conclusion of World War I virtually all ice hockey programs were located at universities in the Northeastern United States making the task of determining the champion fairly easy.

No.	Season	Start	Finish	Intercollegiate champion (number)	Coach	Champion record (Note: Only games against fellow American colleges are included.)
1	1894–95	November	February	none (Note: Johns Hopkins was the only active college team.)	N/A	N/A
2	1895–96	December	March	none (Note: As only two teams were actively playing ice hockey, no championship was necessary.)	N/A	N/A
3	1896–97	December	March	none	N/A	N/A
4	1897–98	December	March	Brown	none	(4–0–1)
5	1898–99	December	February	Yale	none	(5–0–0)
6	1899–1900	December	March	Yale (2)	none	(7–0–0)
7	1900–01	November	March	Yale (3)	none	(5–2–0)
8	1901–02	December	March	Yale (4)	none	(8–0–0)
9	1902–03	December	March	Harvard	none	(7–0–0)
10	1903–04	December	March	Harvard (2)	Alfred Winsor	(4–0–0)
11	1904–05	December	March	Harvard (3)	Alfred Winsor	(5–0–0)
12	1905–06	December	March	Harvard (4)	Alfred Winsor	(4–0–0)
13	1906–07	December	February	Princeton	none	(4–0–0)
14	1907–08	December	February	Yale (5)	none	(5–0–0)
15	1908–09	December	February	Harvard (5)	Alfred Winsor	(6–0–0)
16	1909–10	December	February	Princeton (2)	none	(7–2–0)
17	1910–11	December	March	Cornell	Talbot Hunter	(10–0–0)
18	1911–12	December	March	Princeton (3)	none	(8–2–0)
19	1912–13	December	March	Harvard (6)	Alfred Winsor	(8–1–0)
20	1913–14	December	March	Princeton (4)	Gus Hornfeck	(7–1–0)
21	1914–15	December	March	None (Note: Dartmouth, Harvard, and Yale finished in a three-way tie, and their wins against other teams that season left no team with a singular claim to the intercollegiate championship.)	N/A	N/A
22	1915–16	December	March	Harvard (7)	Alfred Winsor	(6–0–0)
23	1916–17	December	March	None (Note: Harvard, Princeton and Yale finished in a three-way tie and their wins against other teams that season left no team with a singular claim to the intercollegiate championship.)	N/A	N/A

== Trials and Changes ==
When the United States entered World War I in April 1917, many college students joined the United States Armed Forces. As a result many colleges suspended some or all of their athletic programs for the duration of the war. A few ice hockey programs continued to operate for the 1917–18 season but those were perishingly few. Because the war was over by November 1918, many prospective students were able to attend college for the spring semester in 1919. This meant that the ice hockey programs who were suspended could be restarted quickly. College Ice hockey returned for its first full season with the 1919–20 campaign and, with the number of teams in the midwest who had started programs over the previous few seasons, teams were now vying for Eastern and Western collegiate championships. Even with that addition, the biggest change was yet to come.

In 1920, following the example of most other leagues on the continent, college hockey shifted from 7-on-7 to 6-on-6. Furthermore, the game times were altered from two halves to three periods. These changes allowed for a faster game not only because there were fewer players on the ice, but because many of the rinks that were built in the 1920s were significantly larger than the ones that had been used previously. It also meant that players would have more time to recover from strenuous play (two formal breaks rather than one) and help to increase the amount of substitutions that would occur throughout the games (though it was still common for some athletes to play the entire game).

The college game continued to expand and was aided not only by the addition of regional rinks like the Philadelphia Arena and the New Haven Arena, but also by some universities building their own venues. The first of these was the Russell Sage Rink for Hamilton, which was followed soon after by Princeton's Hobey Baker Memorial Rink, Dartmouth's Davis Rink and Army's Smith Rink. More and more programs appeared and were able to use the increasing amount of available ice throughout the 1920s, but after the stock market crash in 1929, the colleges faced tough decisions moving forward.

No.	Season	Start	Finish	Intercollegiate champion (number)		Coach(es)	Champion record(s) (Note: Only games against fellow American colleges are included.)
No.	Season	Start	Finish	East	West	Coach(es)	Champion record(s)
24	1917–18	January	February	None (Note: Most college programs were suspended, and few games were played among the remaining schools.)		N/A	N/A
25	1918–19	January	March	None (Note: Many programs were restarted, but too few games were played to decide upon a champion.)		N/A	N/A
26	1919–20	January	March	Harvard (8)		William Claflin	(7–0–0)
27	1920–21	December	March	Harvard (9)		William Claflin	(6–0–0)
28	1921–22	December	March	Harvard (10)	Notre Dame	William Claflin / Paul Castner	(6–0–0) / (5–0–0)
29	1922–23	December	March	Boston College	Minnesota	Fred Rocque / Emil Iverson	(5–0–0) / (10–1–1)
30	1923–24	December	March	Yale (6)	Minnesota (2)	Clarence Wanamaker / Emil Iverson	(14–1–0) / (11–1–0)
31	1924–25	December	March	Yale (7)	Michigan	Clarence Wanamaker / Joe Barss	(11–1–1) / (4–1–1)
32	1925–26	December	March	Harvard (11)	Minnesota (3)	Edward Bigelow / Emil Iverson	(8–1–0) / (12–0–4)
33	1926–27	December	March	Harvard (12)	None (Note: Michigan had split their season series with both Minnesota and Michigan Tech.)	Edward Bigelow / —	(7–0–1) / —
34	1927–28	December	March	None (Note: Dartmouth, Harvard and Yale had defeated one another during the season. Clarkson finished with a 9–1 record, but had not played any of the three, and were not considered for the championship.)	Marquette	— / Kay Iverson	— / (8–1–0)
35	1928–29	December	March	Yale (8)	Minnesota (4)	Lawrence Noble / Emil Iverson	(10–1–1) / (13–2–0)

== Great Depression ==
At the beginning of the Great Depression, most college's continued to fund the ice hockey programs. However, as the economic disaster took hold, several school were no longer able to support the expensive sport. Most of the established programs continued, but some, like Boston College and Rensselaer were forced to suspend for several seasons. Other programs like Marquette and Gonzaga have never recovered.

Despite financial difficulties, however, the colleges and communities that supported programs during the 1930s became enthralled by the game and led to an increasing number of games played by schools. In addition, there was enough money in some budgets to permit travel beyond the immediate area and games between East, West and even Pacific teams became more common.

Because the NCAA did not sponsor a tournament or recognize ice hockey as a national sport, several different organizations conferred 'National Championship' status on colleges during this time. While there were no official National Champions during the 1930s, several schools claim titles during this era. By the mid-30s, most of the Midwest teams had suspended, leaving only Michigan, Michigan Tech and Minnesota by 1936. Illinois joined soon afterwards but Midwest hockey wouldn't recover until after World War II.

No.	Season	Start	Finish	Intercollegiate champion (number)		Coach(es)	Champion record(s) (Note: Only games against fellow American colleges are included.)
No.	Season	Start	Finish	East	West	Coach(es)	Champion record(s)
36 (Note: Yale defeated Marquette during the season.)	1929–30	December	March	Yale (9) / Harvard (13) (Note: Yale and Harvard tied each other over a three-game series while defeating all other eastern opponents.)	Marquette (2)	Lawrence Noble / Joseph Stubbs / Kay Iverson	(10–1–1) / (7–2–1) / (8–3–0)
37	1930–31	December	March	Yale (10)	Michigan (2)	Holcomb York / Eddie Lowrey	(9–0–0) / (7–4–1)
38 (Note: Harvard defeated Minnesota during the season.)	1931–32	December	March	Harvard (14)	Minnesota (5)	Joseph Stubbs / Frank Pond	(7–0–2) / (7–1–1)
39	1932–33	December	March	Harvard (15)	Minnesota (6)	Joseph Stubbs / Frank Pond	(9–2–0) / (10–1–0)
40	1933–34	December	March	Dartmouth	Minnesota (7)	Herbert Gill / Frank Pond	(8–1–0) / (9–1–0)
41	1934–35	December	March	Clarkson	Michigan (3)	Jack Roos / Eddie Lowrey	(6–0–0) / (8–1–2)
42	1935–36	December	March	Clarkson (2) / Harvard (16) (Note: Clarkson and Harvard tied each other over a three-game series while defeating all other eastern opponents.)	Minnesota (8)	Jack Roos / Joseph Stubbs / Larry Armstrong	(6–1–1) / (10–3–1) / (8–2–0)
43	1936–37	December	March	Harvard (17)	None (Note: Michigan and Minnesota split their season series.)	Joseph Stubbs / –	(12–0–0) / –
44	1937–38	December	March	Clarkson (3)	None (Note: Michigan and Minnesota split their season series.)	Jack Roos / –	(4–0–0) / –
45	1938–39	December	March	Dartmouth (2)	Minnesota (9)	Eddie Jeremiah / Larry Armstrong	(10–0–0) / (12–2–0)
46 (Note: Minnesota defeated Yale twice in their undefeated season, making this the first year a western team could claim a unified national Championship. In addition, Minnesota won the AAU tournament and were declared 'National Champions' by that organization.)	1939–40	December	March	Yale (11)	Minnesota (10)	Murray Murdoch / Larry Armstrong	(8–2–1) / (14–0–0)
47	1940–41	December	March	Boston College (2)	Illinois	John Kelley / Vic Heyliger	(13–1–0) / (13–3–1)

== World War II and aftermath ==
Unlike when the US had entered World War I, most colleges attempted to play through the beginning of war. Most schools continued until the end of the 1943 season when a decline in enrollment and the necessities of the war forced many programs to pause. Some, like Dartmouth and Clarkson, soldiered on but with a severe reduction in the number of schools participating, none could legitimately claim a championship during this time.

After the war's end in 1945, most programs quickly restarted, though there were some conspicuous absences. Most of the Pacific teams did not return; only California resumed play but the program was shuttered in 1949. Illinois also did not return and neither did any of the Pittsburgh- or Cleveland-area colleges that had attempted to form a league at the end of the 30s. However, by 1947 enough colleges were playing varsity hockey for the NCAA to finally take notice and a National Ice Hockey Tournament was instituted for the first time. That made the 1947–48 season the first official NCAA campaign. When the tournament was instituted, the schools that were fielding teams were located primarily in the northeast and upper Midwest, the two regions that have dominated American ice hockey ever since.

No.	Season	Start	Finish	Intercollegiate champion (number)		Coach(es)	Champion record(s) (Note: Only games against fellow American colleges are included.)
No.	Season	Start	Finish	East	West	Coach(es)	Champion record(s)
48 (Note: Dartmouth and Illinois split their season series 1–1.)	1941–42	December	March	Dartmouth (3)	Illinois (2)	Eddie Jeremiah / Vic Heyliger	(20–2–0) / (7–3–2)
49	1942–43	December	March	Dartmouth (4)	Illinois (3)	George Barclay (Note: Barclay and Dick Rondeau shared coaching duties for Dartmouth in 1943.) / Vic Heyliger	(14–0–1) / (9–1–0)
50	1943–44	January	February	None (Note: Too few teams and games were played to award a championship. Dartmouth possessed the best record at 7–0.)		N/A	N/A
51	1944–45	January	February	None (Note: Too few teams and games were played to award a championship. Dartmouth possessed the best record at 5–0.)		N/A	N/A
52	1945–46	December	March	Dartmouth (5) / Yale (12) (Note: Dartmouth and Yale split their season series while defeating all other eastern opponents.)	Michigan (4)	Eddie Jeremiah / Murray Murdoch / Vic Heyliger	(5–1–0) / (6–1–0) / (7–2–1)
53	1946–47	December	March	Dartmouth (6)	None (Note: Michigan possessed the best claim to a championship, defeating Minnesota in their season series while splitting with Michigan Tech and Colorado College, but their final intercollegiate record was 5–4–1, and they had lost to Dartmouth during the season.)	Eddie Jeremiah / –	(15–2–0) / –

== See also ==
- List of NCAA Division I men's ice hockey seasons
