= 1916–17 Yale Bulldogs men's ice hockey season =

Yale men's ice hockey season

Intercollegiate Hockey League, co-Champion
- Conference: T–1st IHL
- Home ice: New Haven Arena

Record
- Overall: 10–4–0
- Home: 8–2–0
- Road: 1–1–0
- Neutral: 1–1–0

Coaches and captains
- Head coach: Fred Rocque
- Captain: Lawrence Murray

The 1916–17 Yale Bulldogs men's ice hockey season was the 22nd season of play for the program.

== Season ==
On December 13, Yale announced Fred Rocque as their head coach. While the Bulldogs had coaches in years past, Rocque is cited as the first official coach in team history. Rocque, who had previously coached Dartmouth, substituted his player much more than the team had previously and would commonly have players perform at multiple positions in the same game. This tactic helped prevent the Elis from flagging at the end of games, something they had trouble with in recent years.

Yale had their best season in 18 years, posting a .714 winning percentage in 14 games. More importantly, the Elis won the season series against Harvard for the first time since 1908. The Bulldogs two overtime losses to Princeton cost them, however, as the series loss left all three teams in a three-way tie in the IHL and prevented any team from claiming the Intercollegiate Championship for 1917.

After the season the United States officially entered World War I. While most programs were suspended as a result, Yale's men's team would attempt to muddle through the season.

== Roster ==
No.	Nat.	Player	Class	Pos	Height	Weight	DoB	Hometown	Previous team
	(United States)	Lester Armour	Junior	C/R	5' 10" (1.78 m)	150 lb (68 kg)	1895-03-21	Chicago, Illinois	St. Mark's School
		Baker		LW
		John E. Bierwirth	Senior	D/RW	5' 10" (1.78 m)	165 lb (75 kg)			Hotchkiss School
		Andrew J. Fox Jr.	Sophomore	LW
	(United States)	Erl C. B. Gould	Junior	C/LW	5' 10" (1.78 m)	150 lb (68 kg)	1895-10-03	Baltimore, Maryland	St. Paul's School
		Everett Griggs	Junior	LW			1891-05-08
		Kelley		RW
	(United States)	Henry H. Landon Jr.	Senior	D			1893-11-24	Manhattan, New York	St. Mark's School
	(United States)	George M. Laughlin III	Junior	LW	6' 1" (1.85 m)	155 lb (70 kg)	1895-11-14	Pittsburgh, Pennsylvania	St. Paul's School
	(United States)	Archibald G. McIlwaine II	Sophomore	R/D/C/RW			1895-11-20
		Lawrence N. Murray (C)	Senior	D	5' 11" (1.8 m)	160 lb (73 kg)			St. Paul's School
		Newton	Sophomore	G
		Henry H. Scudder	Junior	G
		Clarence Stanley	Sophomore	RW	5' 10" (1.78 m)	160 lb (73 kg)			Berkshire School
		Howell Van Nostrand	Junior	C	5' 10" (1.78 m)	156 lb (71 kg)			Westminster School
		Ward		RW
	(United States)	Holcomb York	Senior	G	5' 10" (1.78 m)	160 lb (73 kg)	1895-05-04	New Haven, Connecticut	Hotchkiss School

== Standings ==
1916–17 Collegiate ice hockey standings
	Intercollegiate							Overall					
	GP	W	L	T	PCT.	GF	GA	GP	W	L	T	GF	GA
Army	7	4	3	0	.571	18	15	11	6	5	0	31	21
Colgate	3	2	1	0	.667	14	10	3	2	1	0	14	10
Dartmouth	7	6	1	0	.857	20	9	10	7	3	0	26	16
Harvard	8	5	3	0	.625	23	9	12	8	4	0	39	18
Massachusetts Agricultural	8	3	3	2	.500	22	15	8	3	3	2	22	15
MIT	7	2	4	1	.357	17	26	7	2	4	1	17	26
New York State	–	–	–	–	–	–	–	–	–	–	–	–	–
Princeton	8	4	4	0	.500	18	21	10	5	5	0	26	27
Rensselaer	6	2	4	0	.333	10	21	6	2	4	0	10	21
Williams	6	2	3	1	.417	15	13	7	2	4	1	17	17
Yale	11	7	4	0	.636	35	24	14	10	4	0	47	31
YMCA College	–	–	–	–	–	–	–	–	–	–	–	–	–

1916–17 Intercollegiate Hockey League standings
	Conference								Overall					
	GP	W	L	T	PTS	SW	GF	GA	GP	W	L	T	GF	GA
Harvard *	6	3	3	0	.500	1	12	9	12	8	4	0	39	18
Princeton *	6	3	3	0	.500	1	13	14	10	5	5	0	26	27
Yale *	6	3	3	0	.500	1	11	13	14	10	4	0	47	31
* indicates conference co-champion

== Schedule and results ==
Date	Opponent	Site	Result	Record
Regular season
December 20	vs. Yale Freshman Team*	New Haven Arena • New Haven, Connecticut (Exhibition)	L 3–4	
December 23	at St. Nicholas Hockey Club*	St. Nicholas Rink • New York, New York	W 4–2	1–0–0
January 10	Williams*	New Haven Arena • New Haven, Connecticut	W 3–2	2–0–0
January 13	vs. Princeton	St. Nicholas Rink • New York, New York	W 2–1	3–0–0 (1–0–0)
January 17	Princeton	New Haven Arena • New Haven, Connecticut	L 3–4 ^{2OT}	3–1–0 (1–1–0)
January 24	Massachusetts Agricultural*	New Haven Arena • New Haven, Connecticut	W 5–3	4–1–0
January 25	Colgate*	New Haven Arena • New Haven, Connecticut	W 7–3	5–1–0
February 3	MIT*	New Haven Arena • New Haven, Connecticut	W 8–1	6–1–0
February 5	Dartmouth*	New Haven Arena • New Haven, Connecticut	L 1–2	6–2–0
February 10	St. Nicholas Hockey Club*	New Haven Arena • New Haven, Connecticut	W 3–2 ^{OT}	7–2–0
February 17	Harvard	New Haven Arena • New Haven, Connecticut (Rivalry)	W 2–0	8–2–0 (2–1–0)
February 24	Philadelphia Wanderers*	New Haven Arena • New Haven, Connecticut	W 5–3	9–2–0
February 28	vs. Princeton	St. Nicholas Rink • New York, New York	L 2–3 ^{3OT}	9–3–0 (2–2–0)
March 3	at Harvard	Boston Arena • Boston, Massachusetts (Rivalry)	L 0–5	9–4–0 (2–3–0)
March 10	Harvard	New Haven Arena • New Haven, Connecticut (Rivalry)	W 2–0	10–4–0 (3–3–0)
*Non-conference game.
