= List of United States collegiate men's ice hockey champions =

Prior to the advent of the NCAA Division I Men's Ice Hockey Tournament in 1948, the champion of college ice hockey in the United States was not officially decided, at least not according to the NCAA.

== History ==
In the early years, naming a champion was a fairly easy task as there were few active teams and many played one another during the season. Some upper-echelon schools formed an intercollegiate hockey league around the turn of the century and began playing one another on a consistent basis. Due to this informal schedule the schools were able to declare a champion between the members and have that team serve as the de facto collegiate champion. Several of the smaller schools, like Williams College or Union College were not considered for the championship for a few reasons, chief among which was that their level of competition usually did not raise to the standards of Harvard or Yale.

After World War I ice hockey teams began sprouting up across New England and the rust belt making the naming of an individual champion more difficult. As a result the regions (East and West) would usually have their own intercollegiate champion.

== Champions ==
Year	Winning team	Coach	Record
1898	Brown	No coach	4–0–1
1899	Yale	No coach	5–0–0
1900	Yale	No coach	7–0–0
1901	Yale	No coach	5–2–0
1902	Yale	No coach	8–0–0
1903	Harvard	No coach	7–0–0
1904	Harvard	Alfred Winsor	4–0–0
1905	Harvard	Alfred Winsor	6–0–0
1906	Harvard	Alfred Winsor	4–0–0
1907	Princeton	None	4–0–0
1908	Yale	None	5–0–0
1909	Harvard	Alfred Winsor	6–0–0
1910	Princeton	None	7–2–0
1911	Cornell	None	10–0–0
1912	Princeton	None	8–2–0
1913	Harvard	Alfred Winsor	8–1–0
1914	Princeton	Gus Hornfeck	7–1–0
1915	Harvard	Alfred Winsor	7–1–0
1916	Harvard	Alfred Winsor	6–0–0
1917	None	None	N/A
1918	None	None	N/A
1919	None	None	N/A
1920	Harvard	William Claflin	7–0–0

== Team titles ==
Team	Number	Years Won
Harvard	9	1903, 1904, 1905, 1906, 1909, 1913, 1915, 1916, 1920
Yale	5	1899, 1900, 1901, 1902, 1908
Princeton	4	1907, 1910, 1912, 1914
Brown	1	1898
Cornell	1	1911

== See also ==
- List of United States collegiate men's ice hockey seasons
- List of NCAA Division I men's ice hockey champions
