= 1916–17 Princeton Tigers men's ice hockey season =

College ice hockey season

Intercollegiate Hockey League, co-Champion
- Conference: T–1st IHL
- Home ice: Lake Carnegie

Record
- Overall: 5–5–0
- Conference: 2–4–0
- Road: 1–3–0
- Neutral: 4–2–0

Coaches and captains
- Head coach: Stuart Paton
- Assistant coaches: Grant Peacock
- Captain: William Schoen

The 1916–17 Princeton Tigers men's ice hockey season was the 18th season of play for the program.

== Season ==
Princeton opened the season with three games over the winter break, taking two of the matches. senior netminder Henry Ford was the star of the games and there was hope that the Tigers would ride his play back to the top of the college hockey landscape. Championship aspirations were dealt a serious blow when Princeton lost to Dartmouth in the intercollegiate opener.

Yale handed Princeton its third consecutive loss and, though the Tigers played better after shuffling their lineup, they were in danger of falling to the bottom of the league standings. More experience with the new arrangement helped Princeton arrest their fall and take down the Bulldogs in the rematch, albeit in double overtime. The team was looking like they had an outside chance at the championship when the defeated Harvard 2–1 thanks to a goal from captain William Schoen with just 15 seconds remaining.

Harvard returned the favor with a win of their own in early February. Princeton had a 22-day layoff before the deciding game against the Crimson and the team was unable to score in a 0–2 loss. The Tigers were able to end their season on a high note when they battled Yale for the third time. Both teams were tied at 2 after regulation but as neither could score in the first two 5-minute overtimes, a third sudden-death overtime was instituted. This may be the first college game to go past the second overtime.

A few weeks later Yale won their series against Harvard, putting the teams in a three-way tie. After the season John Humphreys was selected as the top Point in college hockey.

Due to the United States entering World War I in April, Princeton's ice hockey team was suspended for the duration of the war. The team would return to the ice for the end of the 1918–19 season.

== Roster ==
No.	Nat.	Player	Class	Pos	Height	Weight	DoB	Hometown	Previous team
		Harold Comey	Senior	R/D
		Holbrook Cushman	Junior	W
		Henry W. Ford	Senior	G
		Paul W. Hills	Senior	D/LW
		John Humphreys	Senior	D
		William Humphreys	Senior	RW/R
		William Schoen (C)	Senior	C
		John Scully	Senior	D

== Standings ==
1916–17 Collegiate ice hockey standings
	Intercollegiate							Overall					
	GP	W	L	T	PCT.	GF	GA	GP	W	L	T	GF	GA
Army	7	4	3	0	.571	18	15	11	6	5	0	31	21
Colgate	3	2	1	0	.667	14	10	3	2	1	0	14	10
Dartmouth	7	6	1	0	.857	20	9	10	7	3	0	26	16
Harvard	8	5	3	0	.625	23	9	12	8	4	0	39	18
Massachusetts Agricultural	8	3	3	2	.500	22	15	8	3	3	2	22	15
MIT	7	2	4	1	.357	17	26	7	2	4	1	17	26
New York State	–	–	–	–	–	–	–	–	–	–	–	–	–
Princeton	8	4	4	0	.500	18	21	10	5	5	0	26	27
Rensselaer	6	2	4	0	.333	10	21	6	2	4	0	10	21
Williams	6	2	3	1	.417	15	13	7	2	4	1	17	17
Yale	11	7	4	0	.636	35	24	14	10	4	0	47	31
YMCA College	–	–	–	–	–	–	–	–	–	–	–	–	–

1916–17 Intercollegiate Hockey League standings
	Conference								Overall					
	GP	W	L	T	PTS	SW	GF	GA	GP	W	L	T	GF	GA
Harvard *	6	3	3	0	.500	1	12	9	12	8	4	0	39	18
Princeton *	6	3	3	0	.500	1	13	14	10	5	5	0	26	27
Yale *	6	3	3	0	.500	1	11	13	14	10	4	0	47	31
* indicates conference co-champion

== Schedule and results ==
Date	Opponent	Site	Result	Record
Regular Season
December 19	vs. St. Paul's School*	St. Nicholas Rink • New York, New York	W 6–1	1–0–0
December 20	vs. Williams*	St. Nicholas Rink • New York, New York	W 2–1	2–0–0
January 2	at Boston Athletic Association*	Boston Arena • Boston, Massachusetts	L 2–5	2–1–0
January 10	vs. Dartmouth*	St. Nicholas Rink • New York, New York	L 3–6	2–2–0
January 13	vs. Yale	St. Nicholas Rink • New York, New York	L 1–2	2–3–0 (0–1–0)
January 17	vs. Yale	New Haven Arena • New Haven, Connecticut	W 4–3 ^{2OT}	3–3–0 (1–1–0)
January 20	vs. Harvard	St. Nicholas Rink • New York, New York	W 2–1	4–3–0 (2–1–0)
February 2	vs. Harvard	Boston Arena • Boston, Massachusetts	L 3–4	4–4–0 (2–2–0)
February 24	at Harvard	Boston Arena • Boston, Massachusetts	L 0–2	4–5–0 (2–3–0)
February 28	at Yale	St. Nicholas Rink • New York, New York	W 3–2 ^{3OT}	5–5–0 (3–3–0)
*Non-conference game.
