= 1916–17 Dartmouth men's ice hockey season =

- Conference: Independent
- Home ice: Occom Pond

Record
- Overall: 7–3–0
- Home: 1–1–0
- Road: 5–2–0
- Neutral: 1–0–0

Coaches and captains
- Head coach: Clarence Wanamaker
- Captain: Ralph Tyler

The 1916–17 Dartmouth men's ice hockey season was the 12th season of play for the program.

== Season ==
After a disappointing finish the year before, Dartmouth got off to a great start with a win over perennial power, Princeton. With a loss to two-time defending champion Harvard in the next game, however, the Greens lost much hope of claiming the intercollegiate championship. That setback didn't deter them, however, as they won their next five intercollegiate matches, including Yale.

A huge shock for the season was when Yale defeated Harvard in their best-of-three series and caused the three Intercollegiate Hockey League teams to tie for the conference title. The tie left the door open for Dartmouth but the loss to Harvard prevented the Greens from being able to claim a superior record. So long as Harvard could trump Dartmouth the Hanoverians could not claim the championship despite a 6–1 intercollegiate record, the best in the nation.

Note: Dartmouth College did not possess a moniker for its athletic teams until the 1920s, however, the university had adopted 'Dartmouth Green' as its school color in 1866.

== Roster ==
No.	Nat.	Player	Class	Pos	Height	Weight	DoB	Hometown	Previous team
		Clarence Austin		D
	(United States)	Ralph D. Bickford	Junior	C			1895-03-12	Rochester, New York
	(United States)	Burton L. Gale Jr.	Senior	D			1894-12-05	Warren, Pennsylvania
	(United States)	Chester O. Gale	Sophomore	G			1896-09-27	Warren, Pennsylvania
	(United States)	Pierce G. Geran		R	5' 9" (1.75 m)	179 lb (81 kg)	1896-08-03	Holyoke, Massachusetts
	(United States)	John H. Murphy	Sophomore	LW				Malden, Massachusetts
	(United States)	Robert J. Paisley	Sophomore	RW				Melrose, Massachusetts
		Wendell G. Reycroft	Senior	C
		Ross		G
	(United States)	Ralph Tyler	Senior	R				Exeter, New Hampshire

== Standings ==
1916–17 Collegiate ice hockey standings
	Intercollegiate							Overall					
	GP	W	L	T	PCT.	GF	GA	GP	W	L	T	GF	GA
Army	7	4	3	0	.571	18	15	11	6	5	0	31	21
Colgate	3	2	1	0	.667	14	10	3	2	1	0	14	10
Dartmouth	7	6	1	0	.857	20	9	10	7	3	0	26	16
Harvard	8	5	3	0	.625	23	9	12	8	4	0	39	18
Massachusetts Agricultural	8	3	3	2	.500	22	15	8	3	3	2	22	15
MIT	7	2	4	1	.357	17	26	7	2	4	1	17	26
New York State	–	–	–	–	–	–	–	–	–	–	–	–	–
Princeton	8	4	4	0	.500	18	21	10	5	5	0	26	27
Rensselaer	6	2	4	0	.333	10	21	6	2	4	0	10	21
Williams	6	2	3	1	.417	15	13	7	2	4	1	17	17
Yale	11	7	4	0	.636	35	24	14	10	4	0	47	31
YMCA College	–	–	–	–	–	–	–	–	–	–	–	–	–

== Schedule and results ==
Date	Opponent	Site	Result	Record
Regular Season
January 10	vs. Princeton*	St. Nicholas Rink • New York, New York	W 6–3	1–0–0
January 13	at Harvard*	Boston Arena • Boston, Massachusetts	L 0–3	1–1–0
January 20	Massachusetts Agricultural*	Occom Pond • Hanover, New Hampshire	W 2–0	2–1–0
February 2	at Pittsburgh Athletic Association*	Duquesne Garden • Pittsburgh, Pennsylvania	L 4–5	2–2–0
February 3	at Pittsburgh Athletic Association*	Duquesne Garden • Pittsburgh, Pennsylvania	W 2–1	3–2–0
February 5	at Yale*	New Haven Arena • New Haven, Connecticut	W 2–1	4–2–0
February 6	at Army*	Stuart Rink • West Point, New York	W 3–0	5–2–0
February 9	Bishop's*	Occom Pond • Hanover, New Hampshire	L 0–1	5–3–0
February 16	at Williams*	Weston Field Rink • Williamstown, Massachusetts	W 4–1	6–3–0
February 17	at Massachusetts Agricultural*	Alumni Field Rink • Amherst, Massachusetts	W 3–1	7–3–0
*Non-conference game.
