= Alfred Winsor =

American ice hockey player and coach

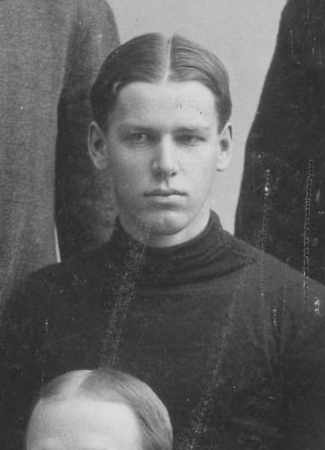
- Alfred Winsor circa 1901–1902 with the ice hockey team of Harvard University.
- Born: January 8, 1880 Brookline, Massachusetts
- Died: September 12, 1961 (aged 81) Cataumet, Massachusetts
- Position: Forward
- Played for: Harvard University; Boston Hockey Club; Boston A.A.
- Playing career: 1900–1912 Coaching career

Biographical details
- Education: Harvard University

Playing career
- 1900–1902: Harvard
- 1911–1912: Boston A.A.

Coaching career (HC unless noted)
- 1903–1917: Harvard
- 1911–1915: Boston A.A.
- 1915–1916: Harvard Club
- 1922–1923: Boston A.A.
- 1923–1924: Harvard

Head coaching record
- Overall: 114–38–2 (.747)

Accomplishments and honors

Championships
- 1904 IHA Championship; 1904 Intercollegiate Championship; 1905 IHA Championship; 1905 Intercollegiate Championship; 1906 IHA Championship; 1906 Intercollegiate Championship; 1909 IHA Championship; 1909 Intercollegiate Championship; 1913 IHL Championship; 1913 Intercollegiate Championship; 1915 IHL Championship; 1916 IHL Championship; 1916 Intercollegiate Championship; 1917 IHL co-championship
Medal record
Men's ice hockey
Representing the USA
Winter Olympics
Silver medal – second place	1932 Lake Placid	(Coach)

Alfred "Ralph" Winsor (January 8, 1880 – September 12, 1961) was an American ice hockey coach and amateur ice hockey player. Winsor coached ice hockey at Harvard University between 1903 and 1917.

== Biography ==
Alfred Winsor was born in Brookline, Massachusetts, on January 8, 1880, to Alfred Winsor Sr. and Linda Kennard. Winsor attended Harvard University from where he graduated in 1902. Prior to that he had attended Noble and Greenough's School in Boston.

Winsor played ice hockey at Harvard, at the forward position, between 1900 and 1902 and was captain of the 1902 team that played in the intercollegiate league series against teams from Yale, Princeton, Brown and Columbia. Winsor led his team with 11 goals in six intercollegiate games in 1902 when Harvard finished in second place behind the team from Yale University.

In 1903, at an age of 23, Alfred Winsor took over the coaching duties of the Harvard University hockey team, and he became an instant success when the team won the 1903 intercollegiate series. Winsor became a mainstay as a coach for the Harvard team for 14 years, until 1917, and implemented a rigid defensive system that other teams felt a need to copy to match up against the crimson colored Harvard team.

Concurrently with his coaching career Winsor also continued to play amateur hockey, between 1903 and 1911 on the Boston Hockey Club and in 1912 with the Boston Athletic Association.

In 1932, Winsor coached the American hockey team at the Winter Olympics in Lake Placid where the American team finished with silver medals.

Alfred Winsor died on September 12, 1961, in Cataumet, Massachusetts, at an age of 81. In 1973 he was inducted into the United States Hockey Hall of Fame.

== Head coaching record ==
Record table
Season	Team	Overall	Conference	Standing	Postseason
Harvard Crimson (IHA) (1903–1911)
1903–04	Harvard	6–0–0	4–0–0	1st	IHA Champion
1904–05	Harvard	10–0–0	4–0–0	1st	
1905–06	Harvard	5–0–1	4–0–0	1st	
1906–07	Harvard	8–2–0	3–1–0	2nd	
1907–08	Harvard	7–2–0	3–1–0	2nd	
1908–09	Harvard	9–0–0	4–0–0	1st	
1909–10	Harvard	6–2–0	4–1–0	2nd	
1910–11	Harvard	8–2–0	4–1–0	2nd	
Harvard:		59–8–1	30–4–0		
Harvard Crimson Independent (1911–1912)
1911–12	Harvard	7–3–0			
Harvard:		7–3–0			
Harvard Crimson (IHL) (1912–1917)
1912–13	Harvard	9–2–0	4–1–0	1st	
1913–14	Harvard	8–8–0	3–3–0	2nd	
1914–15	Harvard	9–4–0	4–0–0	1st	
1915–16	Harvard	8–2–0	6–0–0	1st	
1916–17	Harvard	8–4–0	4–3–0	T–1st	
Harvard:		42–20–0	21–7–0		
Harvard Crimson (Triangular League) (1923–1924)
1923–24	Harvard	6–7–1	2–2–0	2nd	
Harvard:		6–7–1	2–2–0		
Total:		114–38–2			
National champion Postseason invitational champion Conference regular season champion Conference regular season and conference tournament champion Division regular season champion Division regular season and conference tournament champion Conference tournament champion
