= 1916–17 Harvard Crimson men's ice hockey season =

College ice hockey season

Intercollegiate Hockey League, co-Champion
- Conference: 1st–tie IHL
- Home ice: Boston Arena

Record
- Overall: 8–4–0
- Conference: 4–3–0
- Home: 6–0–0
- Road: 0–3–0
- Neutral: 2–1–0

Coaches and captains
- Head coach: Alfred Winsor
- Captain: John Morgan

The 1916–17 Harvard Crimson men's ice hockey season was the 20th season of play for the program.

== Season ==
With many of the players from the consecutive championship teams returning, it was a bit galling for Alfred Winsor to watch his team play so poorly in their first game against the Boston Athletic Association. Despite the loss of wingers Kissel and Bliss the hard practices arranged by Windsor seemed to wake up the Crimson and the team responded with a convincing 7–2 win over the Boston Hockey Club.

After the winter break, Harvard played their first official game of the year, trouncing MIT 8–0. After a second shutout, this time over Dartmouth, Harvard left its home rink for the first time to play Princeton. The Tigers played Harvard tough all game long, attacking the Harvard net whenever they could. The first half ended with both team tied at 1, and the staunch defensive work from both goaltenders continued in the second half. Just when it looked like overtime would be needed, Princeton captain Schoen scored the winning goal with 15 seconds to play, putting a wrench in the works for Harvard's championship hopes.

Before the rematch Harvard faced Queen's and were able to exact their revenge from a year before with a 5–1 victory. Harvard flipped the script against Princeton by scoring first and keeping the pressure on the Tiger net, but Schoen scored twice in response to give Princeton a 2–1 lead at half. Harvard was undeterred and scored three times in the third period, carrying the play for most of the second half. Schoen completed his hat-trick late in the game but it was too late to change the outcome and Harvard tied the series to keep their championship window open. A week after a shutout of McGill, Harvard began their series against Yale in New Haven, and once more the Crimson offense couldn't get on track away from Boston. Yale's goaltender, York, stifled Harvard all game long, leading the Elis to a 2–0 win and the first shutout of Harvard by a contemporary in over seven years. The victory was the first for Yale over Harvard since February 1914, but the Crimson would still have a chance to redeem themselves before the season ended.

While Harvard was eager to even the series against Yale, they had to play the rubber match against Princeton first. With the game at home Harvard had the advantage, and a sterling effort from the defense allowed Wylde to record his fourth shutout of the season and gave the series to the Bostonians. With the Tigers thus defeated, Harvard was two wins away from another intercollegiate championship and after they evened the series with Yale by another shutout, it appeared that they were heading for a third consecutive title. Unfortunately, their final game against Yale took place at the New Haven Arena, with a rink much smaller than the Crimson were used to at the Boston Arena. With the captains for both teams sitting out, the Elis relied on their speed and tenacity to keep Harvard at bay. The tactic worked and Yale were able to shut Harvard out for the second time, winning the series 2–1.

Because Princeton had triumphed over Yale, the three teams found themselves locked in a three-way tie in the IHL standings. Rather than try to determine a sole champion the tie was allowed to stand, leaving 1917 without a team able to claim the intercollegiate championship.

Wylde tied his program record with 5 shutouts on the season. His 10 career shutouts was an unofficial team record until 2005.

Less than a month after the season ended, the United States formally entered World War I. As a result, the ice hockey program was mothballed until after the armistice was signed on November 11, 1918.

== Roster ==
No.	Nat.	Player	Class	Pos	Height	Weight	DoB	Hometown	Previous team
	(United States)	William C. Appleton Jr.	Senior	D			1897-03-15	Jamaica Plain, Massachusetts	Noble and Greenough School
	(United States)	Edwin O. Baker	Senior	C	5' 11" (1.8 m)	170 lb (77 kg)	1896-02-21	Cambridge, Massachusetts	Cambridge Latin School
	(United States)	Robert Baldwin	Senior	C			1895-04-09	Wellesley Hills, Massachusetts	Volkmann School
	(United States)	Edward B. Condon	Junior	C			1896-01-31	New York, New York	Pomfret School
	(United States)	Thomas H. Eckfeldt	Senior	D	5' 11" (1.8 m)	164 lb (74 kg)	1896-01-28	New Bedford, Massachusetts	St. Andrew's School
	(United States)	Thomas K. Fisher	Senior	C			1894-01-11	Clinton, Massachusetts	St. Paul's School
	(United States)	Robert E. Gross	Sophomore	RW			1897-05-11	West Roxbury, Massachusetts	St. George's School
	(United States)	Gustav Kissel	Senior	RW			1895-03-03	Washington, D.C.	Milton Academy
	(Canada)	Alan R. Martin	Junior	G/D			1894-10-18	Toronto, Ontario	Cambridge Latin School
	(United States)	John E. P. Morgan (C)	Senior	D	5' 9" (1.75 m)	160 lb (73 kg)	1895-08-09	Lenox, Massachusetts	Middlesex School
	(United States)	William O. P. Morgan	Junior	LW			1895-05-14	Chicago, Illinois	St. Paul's School
	(United States)	George A. Percy	Junior	C	5' 8.5" (1.74 m)	158 lb (72 kg)	1895-05-12	Arlington, Massachusetts	Arlington High School
	(United States)	Theodore H. Rice	Junior	LW	5' 11" (1.8 m)	155 lb (70 kg)	1894-05-24	Dorchester, Massachusetts	Noble and Greenough School
	(United States)	Thomas C. Thatcher Jr.	Junior	RW	5' 11" (1.8 m)	170 lb (77 kg)	1896-08-12	Nahant, Massachusetts	St. Mark's School
	(United States)	Greenough Townsend	Senior	C	5' 8.5" (1.74 m)	145 lb (66 kg)	1895-03-04	New York, New York	St. Paul's School
	(United States)	Henry K. White	Sophomore	D	6' 1" (1.85 m)	153 lb (69 kg)	1897-02-23	Brookline, Massachusetts	St. Paul's School
	(United States)	John Wylde	Senior	G	6' 0" (1.83 m)	149 lb (68 kg)	1893-08-26	Jamaica Plain, Massachusetts	Noble and Greenough School

== Standings ==
1916–17 Collegiate ice hockey standings
	Intercollegiate							Overall					
	GP	W	L	T	PCT.	GF	GA	GP	W	L	T	GF	GA
Army	7	4	3	0	.571	18	15	11	6	5	0	31	21
Colgate	3	2	1	0	.667	14	10	3	2	1	0	14	10
Dartmouth	7	6	1	0	.857	20	9	10	7	3	0	26	16
Harvard	8	5	3	0	.625	23	9	12	8	4	0	39	18
Massachusetts Agricultural	8	3	3	2	.500	22	15	8	3	3	2	22	15
MIT	7	2	4	1	.357	17	26	7	2	4	1	17	26
New York State	–	–	–	–	–	–	–	–	–	–	–	–	–
Princeton	8	4	4	0	.500	18	21	10	5	5	0	26	27
Rensselaer	6	2	4	0	.333	10	21	6	2	4	0	10	21
Williams	6	2	3	1	.417	15	13	7	2	4	1	17	17
Yale	11	7	4	0	.636	35	24	14	10	4	0	47	31
YMCA College	–	–	–	–	–	–	–	–	–	–	–	–	–

1916–17 Intercollegiate Hockey League standings
	Conference								Overall					
	GP	W	L	T	PTS	SW	GF	GA	GP	W	L	T	GF	GA
Harvard *	6	3	3	0	.500	1	12	9	12	8	4	0	39	18
Princeton *	6	3	3	0	.500	1	13	14	10	5	5	0	26	27
Yale *	6	3	3	0	.500	1	11	13	14	10	4	0	47	31
* indicates conference co-champion

== Schedule and results ==
Date	Opponent	Site	Result	Record
Regular Season
December 16	vs. Boston Athletic Association*	Boston Arena • Boston, Massachusetts	L 0–6	0–1–0
December 20	vs. Boston Hockey Club*	Boston Arena • Boston, Massachusetts	W 7–2	1–1–0
January 8	vs. MIT*	Boston Arena • Boston, Massachusetts	W 8–0	2–1–0
January 13	Dartmouth*	Boston Arena • Boston, Massachusetts	W 3–0	3–1–0
January 20	vs. Princeton	St. Nicholas Rink • New York, New York	L 1–2	3–2–0 (0–1–0)
January 27	Queen's*	Boston Arena • Boston, Massachusetts	W 5–1	4–2–0
February 2	Princeton	Boston Arena • Boston, Massachusetts	W 4–3	5–2–0 (1–1–0)
February 10	McGill*	Boston Arena • Boston, Massachusetts	W 4–0	6–2–0
February 17	at Yale	New Haven Arena • New Haven, Connecticut (Rivalry)	L 0–2	6–3–0 (1–2–0)
February 24	Princeton	Boston Arena • Boston, Massachusetts	W 2–0	7–3–0 (2–2–0)
March 3	Yale	Boston Arena • Boston, Massachusetts (Rivalry)	W 5–0	8–3–0 (3–2–0)
March 10	at Yale	New Haven Arena • New Haven, Connecticut (Rivalry)	L 0–2	8–4–0 (3–3–0)
*Non-conference game.
