= 1916–17 Army Cadets men's ice hockey season =

- Conference: Independent
- Home ice: Stuart Rink

Record
- Overall: 6–5–0

Coaches and captains
- Head coach: Frank Purdon
- Captain: Elbert Ford

The 1916–17 Army Cadets men's ice hockey season was the 14th season of play for the program.

== Season ==
For Frank Purdon's final season behind the bench, Army almost tripled the number of games on its schedule. The team benefited from having an artificial ice rink for both practices and games for the first time, enabling the Cadets to finish with a winning record, defeating four other colleges along the way.

== Roster ==
| No. | Nat. | Player | Class | Pos | Height | Weight | DoB | Hometown | Previous team |
|---|---|---|---|---|---|---|---|---|---|
| | | Armstrong | | D |
| | (United States) | Loyd Van H. Durfee | Junior | LW | | | 1895-12-23 | Ohio |
| | (United States) | Elbert L. Ford Jr. (C) | Senior | D | | | 1892-12-02 | Milford, Connecticut |
| | (United States) | Edwin J. House | Junior | R | | | 1895-07-06 | New York |
| | | Murray | | LW |
| | (United States) | Henry B. Nichols | Freshman | G | | | 1897-03-01 | Connecticut |
| | (United States) | William F. Redfield | Senior | C | | | 1894-04-21 | New York |
| | (United States) | Earl E. Sarcka | Junior | RW | | | 1892-09-23 | Finland |

== Standings ==
1916–17 Collegiate ice hockey standings
| | Intercollegiate | | | | | | | Overall | | | | | |
| | GP | W | L | T | PCT. | GF | GA | GP | W | L | T | GF | GA |
|---|---|---|---|---|---|---|---|---|---|---|---|---|---|
| Army | 7 | 4 | 3 | 0 | .571 | 18 | 15 | 11 | 6 | 5 | 0 | 31 | 21 |
| Colgate | 3 | 2 | 1 | 0 | .667 | 14 | 10 | 3 | 2 | 1 | 0 | 14 | 10 |
| Dartmouth | 7 | 6 | 1 | 0 | .857 | 20 | 9 | 10 | 7 | 3 | 0 | 26 | 16 |
| Harvard | 8 | 5 | 3 | 0 | .625 | 23 | 9 | 12 | 8 | 4 | 0 | 39 | 18 |
| Massachusetts Agricultural | 8 | 3 | 3 | 2 | .500 | 22 | 15 | 8 | 3 | 3 | 2 | 22 | 15 |
| MIT | 7 | 2 | 4 | 1 | .357 | 17 | 26 | 7 | 2 | 4 | 1 | 17 | 26 |
| New York State | – | – | – | – | – | – | – | – | – | – | – | – | – |
| Princeton | 8 | 4 | 4 | 0 | .500 | 18 | 21 | 10 | 5 | 5 | 0 | 26 | 27 |
| Rensselaer | 6 | 2 | 4 | 0 | .333 | 10 | 21 | 6 | 2 | 4 | 0 | 10 | 21 |
| Williams | 6 | 2 | 3 | 1 | .417 | 15 | 13 | 7 | 2 | 4 | 1 | 17 | 17 |
| Yale | 11 | 7 | 4 | 0 | .636 | 35 | 24 | 14 | 10 | 4 | 0 | 47 | 31 |
| YMCA College | – | – | – | – | – | – | – | – | – | – | – | – | – |

== Schedule and results ==
| Date | Opponent | Site | Result | Record |
Regular Season
| | Newman School* | Stuart Rink • West Point, New York | W 9–0 | 1–0–0 |
| January 17 | New York State* | Stuart Rink • West Point, New York | W 10–1 | 2–0–0 |
| | N.Y. National Guard 7th Regiment* | Stuart Rink • West Point, New York | W 2–1 | 3–0–0 |
| January 24 | Colgate* | Stuart Rink • West Point, New York | L 2–5 | 3–1–0 |
| January 26 | YMCA College* | Stuart Rink • West Point, New York | W 4–3 | 4–1–0 |
| January 31 | MIT* | Stuart Rink • West Point, New York | W 2–1 ^{OT} | 5–1–0 |
| February 3 | Massachusetts Agricultural* | Stuart Rink • West Point, New York | L 1–2 | 5–2–0 |
| February 6 | Dartmouth* | Stuart Rink • West Point, New York | L 0–3 | 5–3–0 |
| February 10 | Rensselaer* | Stuart Rink • West Point, New York | W 2–0 | 6–3–0 |
| | New Rochelle Hockey Club* | Stuart Rink • West Point, New York | L 0–2 | 6–4–0 |
| | Verona Hockey Club* | Stuart Rink • West Point, New York | L 2–3 | 6–5–0 |
*Non-conference game.
