= 1905–06 MIT Engineers men's ice hockey season =

- Conference: Independent

Record
- Overall: 1–1–0
- Home: 1–0–0
- Neutral: 0–1–0

Coaches and captains
- Captain: Addison Miller

The 1905–06 MIT Engineers men's ice hockey season was the 7th season of play for the program.

== Season ==
Hopes were high after MIT produced a winning season in 1905 but from the start the '06 team had trouble. Two games to be played in New York City were announced for the Christmas break but as it turned out the matches were never arranged. The college newspaper laid the blame at the feet of team manager Benjamin Sharpe who responded with a defense that no such announcement had been made. The paper stood by its statement and used reports from three Boston-area papers as corroboration.

Note: Massachusetts Institute of Technology athletics were referred to as 'Engineers' or 'Techmen' during the first two decades of the 20th century. By 1920 all sports programs had adopted the Engineer moniker.

== Roster ==
No.	Nat.	Player	Class	Pos	Height	Weight	DoB	Hometown	Previous team
		George Coleman	Sophomore	F
		Joseph Coupal	Junior	F
		Winthrop Ford	Sophomore	F
		Gordon Gilkison	Sophomore	F
		Gardner Gould	Junior	D
		William Kelly	Freshman	F
		Walter Laird	Freshman	D
		Addison Miller (C)	Junior	F
		Erskine Noyes	Junior	D
		Benjamin Sharpe	Junior	G

== Standings ==
1905–06 Collegiate ice hockey standings
	Intercollegiate								Overall					
	GP	W	L	T	PCT.	GF	GA		GP	W	L	T	GF	GA
Army	2	1	1	0	.500	9	10		6	5	1	0	30	13
Brown	7	0	7	0	.000	7	37	†	8	0	8	0	7	40
Carnegie Tech	1	0	1	0	.000	0	5		3	1	2	0	2	11
Columbia	5	3	2	0	.600	10	17		12	4	7	1	24	53
Dartmouth	2	1	1	0	.500	7	7		2	1	1	0	7	7
Harvard	4	4	0	0	1.000	18	5		6	5	0	1	35	8
MIT	1	1	0	0	1.000	5	3		2	1	1	0	6	13
Polytechnic Institute of Brooklyn	–	–	–	–	–	–	–		–	–	–	–	–	–
Princeton	5	2	3	0	.400	13	17		13	6	7	0	40	62
Springfield Training	–	–	–	–	–	–	–		–	–	–	–	–	–
Trinity	–	–	–	–	–	–	–		–	–	–	–	–	–
Union	–	–	–	–	–	–	–		2	0	1	1	–	–
Williams	3	0	3	0	.000	9	13		6	2	4	0	16	20
Yale	8	7	1	0	.875	45	8	†	11	7	3	1	55	22
† There is a scoring discrepancy in a game between Brown and Yale. The game was won by Yale either 7–3 or 3–1.

== Schedule and results ==
Date	Opponent	Site	Result	Record
Regular Season
February 7	vs. Philips Academy*	Brae Burn Rink • Newton, Massachusetts	L 1–10	0–1–0
February 8	at Dartmouth*	Tech Rink • Boston, Massachusetts	W 5–3	1–1–0
*Non-conference game.
