= 1905–06 Williams Ephs men's ice hockey season =

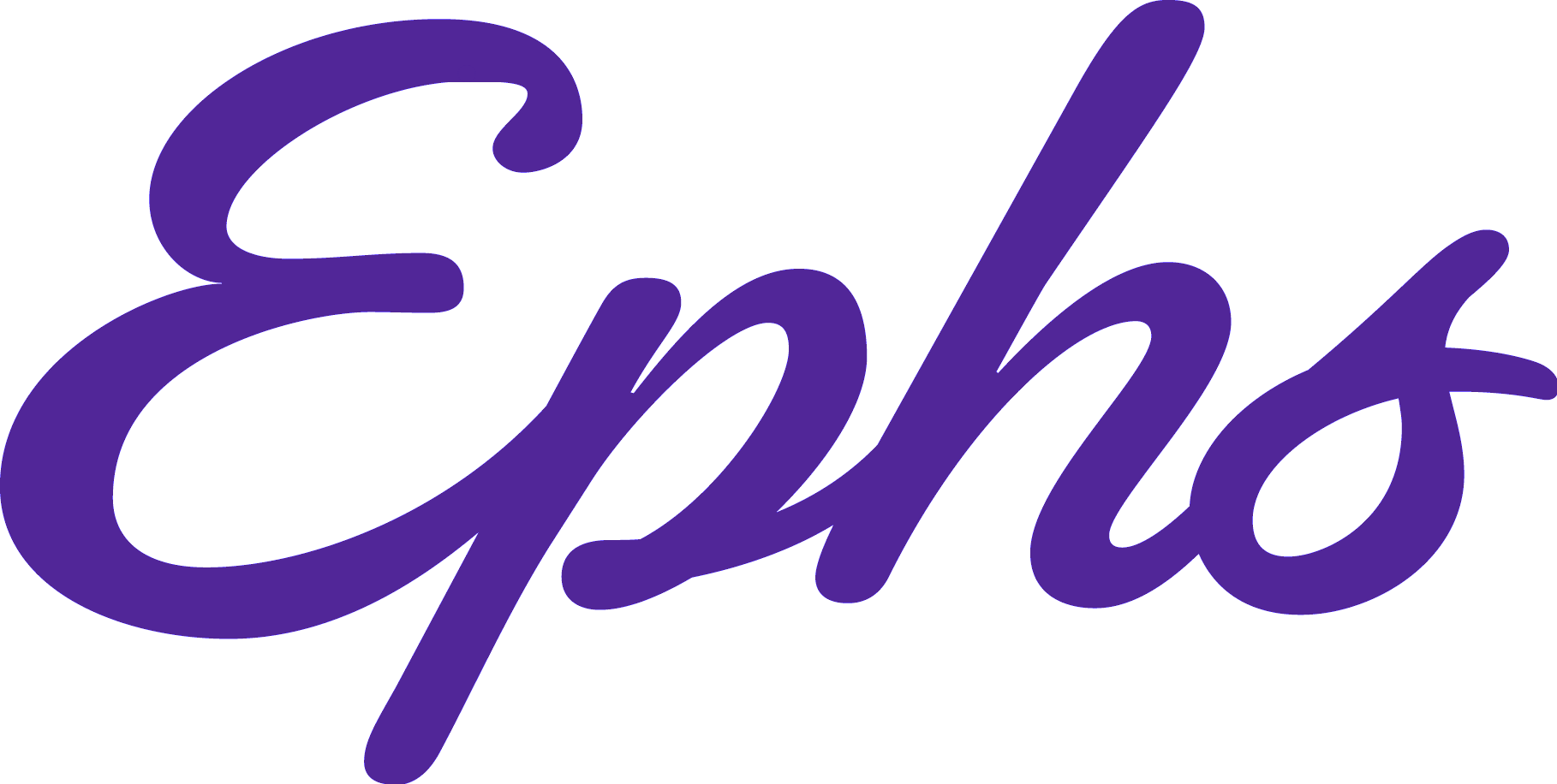
- Home ice: Cole Field House Pond

Record
- Overall: 2–4–0
- Road: 2–2–0
- Neutral: 0–2–0

Coaches and captains

The 1905–06 Williams Ephs men's ice hockey season was the 3rd season of play for the program.

== Standings ==
1905–06 Collegiate ice hockey standings
	Intercollegiate								Overall					
	GP	W	L	T	PCT.	GF	GA		GP	W	L	T	GF	GA
Army	2	1	1	0	.500	9	10		6	5	1	0	30	13
Brown	7	0	7	0	.000	7	37	†	8	0	8	0	7	40
Carnegie Tech	1	0	1	0	.000	0	5		3	1	2	0	2	11
Columbia	5	3	2	0	.600	10	17		12	4	7	1	24	53
Dartmouth	2	1	1	0	.500	7	7		2	1	1	0	7	7
Harvard	4	4	0	0	1.000	18	5		6	5	0	1	35	8
MIT	1	1	0	0	1.000	5	3		2	1	1	0	6	13
Polytechnic Institute of Brooklyn	–	–	–	–	–	–	–		–	–	–	–	–	–
Princeton	5	2	3	0	.400	13	17		13	6	7	0	40	62
Springfield Training	–	–	–	–	–	–	–		–	–	–	–	–	–
Trinity	–	–	–	–	–	–	–		–	–	–	–	–	–
Union	–	–	–	–	–	–	–		2	0	1	1	–	–
Williams	3	0	3	0	.000	9	13		6	2	4	0	16	20
Yale	8	7	1	0	.875	45	8	†	11	7	3	1	55	22
† There is a scoring discrepancy in a game between Brown and Yale. The game was won by Yale either 7–3 or 3–1.

== Schedule and results ==
Date	Opponent	Site	Result	Record
Regular Season
December 29	at Columbia*	St. Nicholas Rink • New York, New York	L 3–4	0–1–0
January 20	vs. Dartmouth*	Empire Rink • Albany, New York	L 3–5	0–2–0
February 2	at Hockey Club of Albany*	Empire Rink • Albany, New York	L 3–5	0–3–0
February 9	vs. Princeton*	Empire Rink • Albany, New York	L 3–4	0–4–0
February 10	at Hockey Club of Albany*	Empire Rink • Albany, New York	W 2–1	1–4–0
February 21	at Hoosac School*	Hoosick, New York	W 2–1	2–4–0
*Non-conference game.
