= 1905–06 Brown Bears men's ice hockey season =

- Conference: 5th IHA

Record
- Overall: 0–8–0
- Conference: 0–4–0
- Road: 0–3–0
- Neutral: 0–5–0

Coaches and captains
- Captain: Prescott Hill

The 1905–06 Brown Bears men's ice hockey season was the 9th season of play for the program. After the season the team was mothballed for 20 years

== Season ==
For the first time Brown played games before the new year. Additionally, the team expanded its schedule to its largest extent in five years. Unfortunately, these changes weren't able to help pull the newly christened Bears out of their funk and the team lost every game for the second year in a row.

After the season, due to poor ice conditions, poor results in games and a lack of support, Brown suspended its ice hockey program. The team would remain dormant for 20 years.

== Roster ==
No.	Nat.	Player	Class	Pos	Height	Weight	DoB	Hometown	Previous team
		Winthrop Adams	Sophomore	F
		Fred Budlong	Freshman
		Elmer Burton	Freshman
		Peter Chase	Senior
		Franklin Chichester	Sophomore
		Albert Harkness	Sophomore
		Prescott Hill (C)	Senior	G
		Edward Hollen	Freshman
		Frederick Lane	Junior	F
		Leonard Little	Junior
		Paul Matteson	Senior
		Harold Paine	Junior
	(United States)	Norman Sammis	Sophomore					Huntington, New York
		Paul SanSouci	Freshman
		Charles Smith	Freshman	F
		Homer Sweet	Junior	F
	(United States)	Harold Tanner	Freshman					Pawtucket, Rhode Island

== Standings ==
1905–06 Collegiate ice hockey standings
	Intercollegiate								Overall					
	GP	W	L	T	PCT.	GF	GA		GP	W	L	T	GF	GA
Army	2	1	1	0	.500	9	10		6	5	1	0	30	13
Brown	7	0	7	0	.000	7	37	†	8	0	8	0	7	40
Carnegie Tech	1	0	1	0	.000	0	5		3	1	2	0	2	11
Columbia	5	3	2	0	.600	10	17		12	4	7	1	24	53
Dartmouth	2	1	1	0	.500	7	7		2	1	1	0	7	7
Harvard	4	4	0	0	1.000	18	5		6	5	0	1	35	8
MIT	1	1	0	0	1.000	5	3		2	1	1	0	6	13
Polytechnic Institute of Brooklyn	–	–	–	–	–	–	–		–	–	–	–	–	–
Princeton	5	2	3	0	.400	13	17		13	6	7	0	40	62
Springfield Training	–	–	–	–	–	–	–		–	–	–	–	–	–
Trinity	–	–	–	–	–	–	–		–	–	–	–	–	–
Union	–	–	–	–	–	–	–		2	0	1	1	–	–
Williams	3	0	3	0	.000	9	13		6	2	4	0	16	20
Yale	8	7	1	0	.875	45	8	†	11	7	3	1	55	22
† There is a scoring discrepancy in a game between Brown and Yale. The game was won by Yale either 7–3 or 3–1.

1905–06 Intercollegiate Hockey Association standings
	Conference							Overall					
	GP	W	L	T	PTS	GF	GA	GP	W	L	T	GF	GA
Harvard *	4	4	0	0	8	18	5	6	5	0	1	35	8
Yale	4	3	1	0	6	19	4	11	7	3	1	55	22
Columbia	4	2	2	0	4	6	14	12	4	7	1	24	53
Princeton	4	1	3	0	2	9	14	13	6	7	0	40	62
Brown	4	0	4	0	0	5	20	8	0	8	0	7	40
* indicates conference champion

== Schedule and results ==
Date	Opponent	Site	Result	Record
Regular Season
December 27	vs. Yale*	Duquesne Garden • Pittsburgh, Pennsylvania	L 0–7	0–1–0
December 28	vs. Yale*	Duquesne Garden • Pittsburgh, Pennsylvania	L 1–7	0–2–0
December 29	vs. Yale*	Duquesne Garden • Pittsburgh, Pennsylvania	L 1–3 †	0–3–0
January 10	vs. Princeton	St. Nicholas Rink • New York, New York	L 4–5 ^{4OT}	0–4–0 (0–1–0)
January 17	vs. Yale	St. Nicholas Rink • New York, New York	L 0–9	0–5–0 (0–2–0)
January 20	at Andover Academy*	Academy Rink • Boston, Massachusetts	L 0–3	0–6–0
February 3	at Columbia	St. Nicholas Rink • New York, New York	L 1–2	0–7–0 (0–3–0)
February 7	at Harvard	Harvard Stadium Rink • Cambridge, Massachusetts	L 0–4	0–8–0 (0–4–0)
*Non-conference game.

† Yale records the score of the game as 7–3 Yale.
