= 1916–17 Massachusetts Agricultural Aggies men's ice hockey season =

- Home ice: Alumni Field Rink

Record
- Overall: 3–3–2
- Home: 2–1–2
- Road: 1–2–0

Coaches and captains
- Captain: David Buttrick

The 1916–17 Massachusetts Agricultural Aggies men's ice hockey season was the 9th season of play for the program.

== Roster ==
| No. | Nat. | Player | Class | Pos | Height | Weight | DoB | Hometown | Previous team |
|---|---|---|---|---|---|---|---|---|---|
| | | David H. Buttrick (C) | Senior | G |
| | | Robert D. Chisholm | Junior |
| | | Steven M. Richardson | Senior |
| | | Donald Ross | Sophomore |
| | (United States) | Louis W. Ross | Senior | | | | 1893-07-18 | Arlington, Massachusetts |
| | (United States) | Paul S. Seavey | Junior | | | | 1897-03-25 | Somerville, Massachusetts |
| | | Albert R. Stiles | Senior |

== Standings ==
1916–17 Collegiate ice hockey standings
| | Intercollegiate | | | | | | | Overall | | | | | |
| | GP | W | L | T | PCT. | GF | GA | GP | W | L | T | GF | GA |
|---|---|---|---|---|---|---|---|---|---|---|---|---|---|
| Army | 7 | 4 | 3 | 0 | .571 | 18 | 15 | 11 | 6 | 5 | 0 | 31 | 21 |
| Colgate | 3 | 2 | 1 | 0 | .667 | 14 | 10 | 3 | 2 | 1 | 0 | 14 | 10 |
| Dartmouth | 7 | 6 | 1 | 0 | .857 | 20 | 9 | 10 | 7 | 3 | 0 | 26 | 16 |
| Harvard | 8 | 5 | 3 | 0 | .625 | 23 | 9 | 12 | 8 | 4 | 0 | 39 | 18 |
| Massachusetts Agricultural | 8 | 3 | 3 | 2 | .500 | 22 | 15 | 8 | 3 | 3 | 2 | 22 | 15 |
| MIT | 7 | 2 | 4 | 1 | .357 | 17 | 26 | 7 | 2 | 4 | 1 | 17 | 26 |
| New York State | – | – | – | – | – | – | – | – | – | – | – | – | – |
| Princeton | 8 | 4 | 4 | 0 | .500 | 18 | 21 | 10 | 5 | 5 | 0 | 26 | 27 |
| Rensselaer | 6 | 2 | 4 | 0 | .333 | 10 | 21 | 6 | 2 | 4 | 0 | 10 | 21 |
| Williams | 6 | 2 | 3 | 1 | .417 | 15 | 13 | 7 | 2 | 4 | 1 | 17 | 17 |
| Yale | 11 | 7 | 4 | 0 | .636 | 35 | 24 | 14 | 10 | 4 | 0 | 47 | 31 |
| YMCA College | – | – | – | – | – | – | – | – | – | – | – | – | – |

== Schedule and results ==
| Date | Opponent | Site | Result | Record |
Regular Season
| January 17 | YMCA College* | Alumni Field Rink • Amherst, Massachusetts | W 9–1 | 1–0–0 |
| January 20 | at Dartmouth* | Occom Pond • Hanover, New Hampshire | L 0–2 | 1–1–0 |
| January 24 | at Yale* | New Haven Arena • New Haven, Connecticut | L 3–5 | 1–2–0 |
| January 30 | MIT* | Alumni Field Rink • Amherst, Massachusetts | T 0–0 ^{2OT} | 1–2–1 |
| February 3 | at Army* | Stuart Rink • West Point, New York | W 2–1 | 2–2–1 |
| February 7 | at YMCA College* | Pratt Field Rink • Springfield, Massachusetts | W 4–2 | 3–2–1 |
| February 17 | Dartmouth* | Alumni Field Rink • Amherst, Massachusetts | L 1–3 | 3–3–1 |
| February 23 | Williams* | Alumni Field Rink • Amherst, Massachusetts | T 1–1 | 3–3–2 |
*Non-conference game.
