= 1905–06 Dartmouth men's ice hockey season =

- Conference: Independent
- Home ice: Occom Pond

Record
- Overall: 1–1–0
- Conference: 1–1–0
- Road: 0–1–0
- Neutral: 1–0–0

Coaches and captains
- Captain: Addison Brooks

The 1905–06 Dartmouth men's ice hockey season was the inaugural season of play for the program.

== Season ==
Joining in with the majority of other future Ivy League teams, Dartmouth began playing ice hockey with the 1905–06 season. The genesis of the team was a result of the efforts of four students from the Cambridge area: Addison Brooks, Eugene Brooks, John Crocker and Warren Foote. All four would eventually serve as captain for the team.

Note: Dartmouth College did not possess a moniker for its athletic teams until the 1920s, however, the university had adopted 'Dartmouth Green' as its school color in 1866.

== Roster ==
No.	Nat.	Player	Class	Pos	Height	Weight	DoB	Hometown	Previous team
	(United States)	Chester S. Brett	Freshman	F/D				Massachusetts
	(United States)	Addison G. Brooks (C)	Senior				1885-08-24	Gloucester, Massachusetts
	(United States)	Eugene C. Brooks	Junior	F			1887-03-11	Cambridge, Massachusetts
	(United States)	John F. Crocker	Junior	G				Cambridge, Massachusetts
	(United States)	Warren C. Foote	Sophomore	F				Newton Center, Massachusetts
	(United States)	Stanley W. Leighton	Freshman	D				Boston, Massachusetts
		John R. McLane	Junior	F
		Joseph L. Richardson	Sophomore	F
		Robert B. Wallace	Senior	F			1884-07-13

== Standings ==
1905–06 Collegiate ice hockey standings
	Intercollegiate								Overall					
	GP	W	L	T	PCT.	GF	GA		GP	W	L	T	GF	GA
Army	2	1	1	0	.500	9	10		6	5	1	0	30	13
Brown	7	0	7	0	.000	7	37	†	8	0	8	0	7	40
Carnegie Tech	1	0	1	0	.000	0	5		3	1	2	0	2	11
Columbia	5	3	2	0	.600	10	17		12	4	7	1	24	53
Dartmouth	2	1	1	0	.500	7	7		2	1	1	0	7	7
Harvard	4	4	0	0	1.000	18	5		6	5	0	1	35	8
MIT	1	1	0	0	1.000	5	3		2	1	1	0	6	13
Polytechnic Institute of Brooklyn	–	–	–	–	–	–	–		–	–	–	–	–	–
Princeton	5	2	3	0	.400	13	17		13	6	7	0	40	62
Springfield Training	–	–	–	–	–	–	–		–	–	–	–	–	–
Trinity	–	–	–	–	–	–	–		–	–	–	–	–	–
Union	–	–	–	–	–	–	–		2	0	1	1	–	–
Williams	3	0	3	0	.000	9	13		6	2	4	0	16	20
Yale	8	7	1	0	.875	45	8	†	11	7	3	1	55	22
† There is a scoring discrepancy in a game between Brown and Yale. The game was won by Yale either 7–3 or 3–1.

== Schedule and results ==
Date	Opponent	Site	Result	Record
Regular Season
January 20	vs. Williams*	Empire Rink • Albany, New York	W 4–2	1–0–0 (1–0–0)
February 8	at MIT*	Tech Rink • Boston, Massachusetts	L 3–5	1–1–0 (1–1–0)
*Non-conference game.
