= 1905–06 Yale Bulldogs men's ice hockey season =

College ice hockey season

- Conference: 2nd IHA

Record
- Overall: 7–3–1
- Conference: 7–1–0
- Road: 2–2–1
- Neutral: 5–1–0

Coaches and captains
- Captain(s): Roger Alling; Rex Flinn

The 1905–06 Yale Bulldogs men's ice hockey season was the 11th season of play for the program.

== Season ==
Yale was one of the strongest teams in college hockey, stopping fellow collegiate team from scoring in five of their eight games. Unfortunately, the Elis still could not overcome their rivals from Harvard. Yale pushed the Crimson into overtime in their final game but Harvard managed to win its seventh consecutive match against the Bulldogs.

The team did not have a coach, however, C. Buchanan Stuart served as team manager.

== Roster ==
| No. | Nat. | Player | Class | Pos | Height | Weight | DoB | Hometown | Previous team |
|---|---|---|---|---|---|---|---|---|---|
| | | Roger E. Alling (C) | Sophomore | F |
| | (United States) | Karl Behr | Senior | F | | | 1885-05-30 | New York, New York |
| | | Johnny Cornell | Senior | F |
| | | John Dilworth | Senior | D |
| | | A. Rex Flinn (C) | Senior | D |
| | | Fred Lang | Junior | G |
| | | Bill Marcus | Senior | F |
| | (United States) | Harold Stanley | Sophomore | F | | | 1885-10-02 | Great Barrington, Massachusetts |

== Standings ==
1905–06 Collegiate ice hockey standings
| | Intercollegiate | | | | | | | | Overall | | | | | |
| | GP | W | L | T | PCT. | GF | GA | | GP | W | L | T | GF | GA |
|---|---|---|---|---|---|---|---|---|---|---|---|---|---|---|
| Army | 2 | 1 | 1 | 0 | .500 | 9 | 10 | | 6 | 5 | 1 | 0 | 30 | 13 |
| Brown | 7 | 0 | 7 | 0 | .000 | 7 | 37 | † | 8 | 0 | 8 | 0 | 7 | 40 |
| Carnegie Tech | 1 | 0 | 1 | 0 | .000 | 0 | 5 | | 3 | 1 | 2 | 0 | 2 | 11 |
| Columbia | 5 | 3 | 2 | 0 | .600 | 10 | 17 | | 12 | 4 | 7 | 1 | 24 | 53 |
| Dartmouth | 2 | 1 | 1 | 0 | .500 | 7 | 7 | | 2 | 1 | 1 | 0 | 7 | 7 |
| Harvard | 4 | 4 | 0 | 0 | 1.000 | 18 | 5 | | 6 | 5 | 0 | 1 | 35 | 8 |
| MIT | 1 | 1 | 0 | 0 | 1.000 | 5 | 3 | | 2 | 1 | 1 | 0 | 6 | 13 |
| Polytechnic Institute of Brooklyn | – | – | – | – | – | – | – | | – | – | – | – | – | – |
| Princeton | 5 | 2 | 3 | 0 | .400 | 13 | 17 | | 13 | 6 | 7 | 0 | 40 | 62 |
| Springfield Training | – | – | – | – | – | – | – | | – | – | – | – | – | – |
| Trinity | – | – | – | – | – | – | – | | – | – | – | – | – | – |
| Union | – | – | – | – | – | – | – | | 2 | 0 | 1 | 1 | – | – |
| Williams | 3 | 0 | 3 | 0 | .000 | 9 | 13 | | 6 | 2 | 4 | 0 | 16 | 20 |
| Yale | 8 | 7 | 1 | 0 | .875 | 45 | 8 | † | 11 | 7 | 3 | 1 | 55 | 22 |
† There is a scoring discrepancy in a game between Brown and Yale. The game was won by Yale either 7–3 or 3–1.

1905–06 Intercollegiate Hockey Association standings
| | Conference | | | | | | | Overall | | | | | |
| | GP | W | L | T | PTS | GF | GA | GP | W | L | T | GF | GA |
|---|---|---|---|---|---|---|---|---|---|---|---|---|---|
| Harvard * | 4 | 4 | 0 | 0 | 8 | 18 | 5 | 6 | 5 | 0 | 1 | 35 | 8 |
| Yale | 4 | 3 | 1 | 0 | 6 | 19 | 4 | 11 | 7 | 3 | 1 | 55 | 22 |
| Columbia | 4 | 2 | 2 | 0 | 4 | 6 | 14 | 12 | 4 | 7 | 1 | 24 | 53 |
| Princeton | 4 | 1 | 3 | 0 | 2 | 9 | 14 | 13 | 6 | 7 | 0 | 40 | 62 |
| Brown | 4 | 0 | 4 | 0 | 0 | 5 | 20 | 8 | 0 | 8 | 0 | 7 | 40 |
* indicates conference champion

== Schedule and results ==
| Date | Opponent | Site | Result | Record |
Regular season
| December 13 | at New York Athletic Club* | St. Nicholas Rink • New York, New York | T 5–5 ^{OT} | 0–0–1 |
| December 19 | at New York Hockey Club* | St. Nicholas Rink • New York, New York | L 1–4 | 0–1–1 |
| December 27 | vs. Brown* | Duquesne Garden • Pittsburgh, Pennsylvania | W 7–0 | 1–1–1 |
| December 28 | vs. Brown* | Duquesne Garden • Pittsburgh, Pennsylvania | W 7–1 | 2–1–1 |
| December 29 | vs. Brown* | Duquesne Garden • Pittsburgh, Pennsylvania | W 7–3 † | 3–1–1 |
| December 30 | at Carnegie Tech* | Duquesne Garden • Pittsburgh, Pennsylvania | W 5–0 | 4–1–1 |
| January 17 | vs. Brown | St. Nicholas Rink • New York, New York | W 9–0 | 5–1–1 (1–0–0) |
| January 27 | at Columbia | St. Nicholas Rink • New York, New York | W 4–0 | 6–1–1 (2–0–0) |
| February 7 | at New York Hockey Club* | St. Nicholas Rink • New York, New York | L 4–5 | 6–2–1 |
| February 10 | vs. Princeton | St. Nicholas Rink • New York, New York | W 3–0 | 7–2–1 (3–0–0) |
| February 17 | vs. Harvard | St. Nicholas Rink • New York, New York (Rivalry) | L 3–4 ^{5OT} | 7–3–1 (3–1–0) |
*Non-conference game.

† Brown records the score of the game as 3–1 for Yale.
