= 1905–06 Columbia men's ice hockey season =

- Conference: 3rd IHA
- Home ice: St. Nicholas Rink

Record
- Overall: 4–7–1
- Conference: 2–2–0
- Home: 4–2–0
- Road: 0–2–0
- Neutral: 0–3–1

Coaches and captains
- Head coach: Rudolph von Bernuth
- Captain: Charles Jackson

The 1905–06 Columbia men's ice hockey season was the 10th season of play for the program.

== Season ==
Graduate student and former varsity player Rudolph Von Bernuth served as the team's coach while K. M. Spence served as team manager.

Note: Columbia University adopted the Lion as its mascot in 1910.

== Roster ==
No.	Nat.	Player	Class	Pos	Height	Weight	DoB	Hometown	Previous team
		David Armstrong	Junior	F
		Lathrop Bartow	Freshman	F
		Thomas Brady Jr.	Senior	F
		Lee Burton	Sophomore	F
		Carlton Dederer	Graduate	F
		Kerner Easton	Senior	G
		James Harrington	Graduate	D
		Charles Jackson (C)	Junior	F/D
		Cyril W. Knight	Graduate	F
		Robert Macbeth	Senior	D
		George Mackenzie	Junior	F
		Robert M. Miller	Junior	F
		John A. Peck	Freshman	F
		Benjamin Willis	Freshman	G/D

== Standings ==
1905–06 Collegiate ice hockey standings
	Intercollegiate								Overall					
	GP	W	L	T	PCT.	GF	GA		GP	W	L	T	GF	GA
Army	2	1	1	0	.500	9	10		6	5	1	0	30	13
Brown	7	0	7	0	.000	7	37	†	8	0	8	0	7	40
Carnegie Tech	1	0	1	0	.000	0	5		3	1	2	0	2	11
Columbia	5	3	2	0	.600	10	17		12	4	7	1	24	53
Dartmouth	2	1	1	0	.500	7	7		2	1	1	0	7	7
Harvard	4	4	0	0	1.000	18	5		6	5	0	1	35	8
MIT	1	1	0	0	1.000	5	3		2	1	1	0	6	13
Polytechnic Institute of Brooklyn	–	–	–	–	–	–	–		–	–	–	–	–	–
Princeton	5	2	3	0	.400	13	17		13	6	7	0	40	62
Springfield Training	–	–	–	–	–	–	–		–	–	–	–	–	–
Trinity	–	–	–	–	–	–	–		–	–	–	–	–	–
Union	–	–	–	–	–	–	–		2	0	1	1	–	–
Williams	3	0	3	0	.000	9	13		6	2	4	0	16	20
Yale	8	7	1	0	.875	45	8	†	11	7	3	1	55	22
† There is a scoring discrepancy in a game between Brown and Yale. The game was won by Yale either 7–3 or 3–1.

1905–06 Intercollegiate Hockey Association standings
	Conference							Overall					
	GP	W	L	T	PTS	GF	GA	GP	W	L	T	GF	GA
Harvard *	4	4	0	0	8	18	5	6	5	0	1	35	8
Yale	4	3	1	0	6	19	4	11	7	3	1	55	22
Columbia	4	2	2	0	4	6	14	12	4	7	1	24	53
Princeton	4	1	3	0	2	9	14	13	6	7	0	40	62
Brown	4	0	4	0	0	5	20	8	0	8	0	7	40
* indicates conference champion

== Schedule and results ==
Date	Opponent	Site	Result	Record
Regular Season
December 6	vs. New York Hockey Club*	St. Nicholas Rink • New York, New York	L 3–11	0–1–0
December 8	at Brooklyn Crescents*	Clermont Avenue Skating Rink • Brooklyn, New York	L 0–6	0–2–0
December 12	vs. Squadron A*	St. Nicholas Rink • New York, New York	W 4–1	1–2–0
December 22	at Brooklyn Crescents*	Clermont Avenue Skating Rink • Brooklyn, New York	L 1–7	1–3–0
December 29	Williams*	St. Nicholas Rink • New York, New York	W 4–3	2–3–0
January 4	vs. New York Athletic Club*	St. Nicholas Rink • New York, New York	T 4–4	2–3–1
January 6	Princeton	St. Nicholas Rink • New York, New York	W 4–2	3–3–1 (1–0–0)
January 11	vs. St. Nicholas Hockey Club*	St. Nicholas Rink • New York, New York	L 2–4	3–4–1
January 13	Harvard	St. Nicholas Rink • New York, New York	L 0–7	3–5–1 (1–1–0)
January 25	vs. New York Athletic Club*	St. Nicholas Rink • New York, New York	L 0–3	3–6–1
January 27	Yale	St. Nicholas Rink • New York, New York	L 0–4	3–7–1 (1–2–0)
February 3	Brown	St. Nicholas Rink • New York, New York	W 2–1	4–7–1 (2–2–0)
*Non-conference game.
