= 1916–17 RPI men's ice hockey season =

- Conference: Independent

Record
- Overall: 2–4–0
- Home: 1–1–0
- Road: 0–3–0
- Neutral: 1–0–0

Coaches and captains
- Captain: Donald Patterson

The 1916–17 RPI men's ice hockey season was the 14th season of play for the program.

== Season ==
Note: Rensselaer's athletic teams were unofficially known as 'Cherry and White' until 1921 when the Engineers moniker debuted for the men's basketball team.

== Roster ==
No.	Nat.	Player	Class	Pos	Height	Weight	DoB	Hometown	Previous team
		Bower		G
		Forsythe		LW
		Keefer		D
		Kelly		LW
		Kraehn		C
		Mohun		RW
		Omerly		R
		Donald B. Patterson (C)		D

== Standings ==
1916–17 Collegiate ice hockey standings
	Intercollegiate							Overall					
	GP	W	L	T	PCT.	GF	GA	GP	W	L	T	GF	GA
Army	7	4	3	0	.571	18	15	11	6	5	0	31	21
Colgate	3	2	1	0	.667	14	10	3	2	1	0	14	10
Dartmouth	7	6	1	0	.857	20	9	10	7	3	0	26	16
Harvard	8	5	3	0	.625	23	9	12	8	4	0	39	18
Massachusetts Agricultural	8	3	3	2	.500	22	15	8	3	3	2	22	15
MIT	7	2	4	1	.357	17	26	7	2	4	1	17	26
New York State	–	–	–	–	–	–	–	–	–	–	–	–	–
Princeton	8	4	4	0	.500	18	21	10	5	5	0	26	27
Rensselaer	6	2	4	0	.333	10	21	6	2	4	0	10	21
Williams	6	2	3	1	.417	15	13	7	2	4	1	17	17
Yale	11	7	4	0	.636	35	24	14	10	4	0	47	31
YMCA College	–	–	–	–	–	–	–	–	–	–	–	–	–

== Schedule and results ==
Date	Opponent	Site	Result	Record
Regular Season
January 13	New York State*	RPI Rink • Troy, New York	W 4–0	1–0–0
January 20	at Williams*	Weston Field Rink • Williamstown, Massachusetts	L 1–7	1–1–0
January 27	at YMCA College*	RPI Rink • Troy, New York	L 0–4	1–2–0
February 7	Albany Hockey Club*	(Exhibition)	T 0–0	
February 10	at Army*	Stuart Rink • West Point, New York	L 0–2	1–3–0
February 17	at Colgate*	Hamilton, New York	L 1–6	1–4–0
February 24	vs. New York State*	State College Rink • Albany, New York	W 4–2	2–4–0
*Non-conference game.
