= 1899–1900 Brown men's ice hockey season =

- Conference: T–3rd IHA

Record
- Overall: 1–5–1
- Conference: 0–3–1
- Home: 1–1–0
- Road: 0–4–1

Coaches and captains
- Captain: Charles Cooke

The 1899–1900 Brown men's ice hockey season was the third season of play for the program. They finished with a 1–5–1 record (0–3–1 in conference play, 1–1–0 at home, 0–4–1 on the road).

== Season ==
After beginning their program with two winning seasons, the men's hockey team had a horrendous third year, losing five of their seven games and being utterly dominated in those games. The only contests they did not get controlled in were the two against teams playing in their first year. Unfortunately, this began a trend of losing for Brown that would not be corrected for almost 30 years.

Charles Cooke was the captain of the team despite not playing in any games and having graduated in 1899.

Note: Brown University did not formally adopt the Bear as its mascot until the fall of 1905.

== Roster ==
No.	Nat.	Player	Class	Pos	Height	Weight	DoB	Hometown	Previous team
	(United States)	LeRoy Bartlett	Sophomore	F			1880-12-17	Kingston, Rhode Island
	(United States)	William Bates	Junior				1879-01-07	Providence, Rhode Island
		Harrison Chase	Junior	G
		Horace Day	Senior	F
		Charles Eaton	Junior
		Frank Gooding	Junior
		Charles Hoyt	Junior
	(United States)	William Low	Junior	F			1879-04-16	Providence, Rhode Island
	(United States)	Horatio Otis	Freshman	F			1883-11-29	Providence, Rhode Island
	(United States)	Theodore Pevear	Sophomore				1881-03-05	Lynn, Massachusetts
		Harry Phillips	Sophomore	D
		Robert Steere	Junior	D
		George Taylor	Junior
		George Walworth	Freshman

== Standings ==
1899–1900 Collegiate ice hockey standings
	Intercollegiate							Overall					
	GP	W	L	T	PCT.	GF	GA	GP	W	L	T	GF	GA
Brown	7	1	5	1	.214	17	39	7	1	5	1	17	39
Buffalo	–	–	–	–	–	–	–	–	–	–	–	–	–
Columbia	–	–	–	–	–	–	–	–	–	–	–	–	–
Cornell	1	0	1	0	.000	1	10	1	0	1	0	1	10
Harvard	5	4	1	0	.800	37	12	9	7	1	1	56	18
MIT	3	0	3	0	.000	7	24	5	2	3	0	15	26
Princeton	4	0	3	1	.125	6	26	6	0	5	1	7	33
Western University of Pennsylvania	–	–	–	–	–	–	–	–	–	–	–	–	–
Yale	7	7	0	0	1.000	37	11	14	10	4	0	49	38

1899–1900 Intercollegiate Hockey Association standings
	Conference								Overall					
	GP	W	L	T	PTS	GF	GA		GP	W	L	T	GF	GA
Yale	5	5	0	0	8	30	7		14	10	4	0	49	38
Columbia	5	3	2	0	6	21	12		–	–	–	–	–	–
Brown	4	0	3	1	1	9	22	†	7	1	5	1	17	39
Princeton	4	0	3	1	1	6	26	†	6	0	5	1	7	33
† The game between Brown and Princeton was cancelled because neither team could finish better than third place.

== Schedule and results ==
Date	Opponent	Site	Result	Record
Regular Season
January 14	MIT*	Aldrich Field Rink • Providence, Rhode Island	W 6–2	1–0–0
January 24	Harvard*	Aldrich Field Rink • Providence, Rhode Island	L 1–8	1–1–0
January 27	at Columbia	St. Nicholas Rink • New York, New York	L 2–7	1–2–0 (0–1–0)
February 2	at Harvard*	Franklin Park • Boston, Massachusetts	L 1–7	1–3–0
February 9	at Yale	New Haven, Connecticut	L 2–7	1–4–0 (0–2–0)
February 23	at Columbia	St. Nicholas Rink • New York, New York	L 1–4	1–5–0 (0–3–0)
February 24	vs. Princeton	St. Nicholas Rink • New York, New York	T 4–4 ^{OT}	1–5–1 (0–3–1)
*Non-conference game.
