= 1899–1900 Cornell men's ice hockey season =

Record
- Overall: 0–1–0
- Road: 0–1–0

Coaches and captains

The 1899–1900 Cornell men's ice hockey season was the inaugural season of play for the program.

== Season ==
The ice hockey team from the University of Buffalo was one of the first collegiate clubs in America, playing their first games as far back as 1896. Unfortunately, because of how far away their nearest contemporaries were, the Blues had trouble finding college opponents. The club played off and on for a few years and looked to finally secure a local rival by inducing Cornell University to field a team. In 1900, they were able to secure a match against the Ithaca school when Cornell agreed to sponsor ice hockey for the first time. Due mostly to the lack of experience and training leading up to the game, Cornell was walloped 1–10. Herbert Wood scored the first goal in the program's history, however, because of how badly the team had been defeated, a proposed second game was abandoned.

Note: Cornell University did not formally adopt 'Big Red' as its moniker until after 1905. They have been, however, associated with 'Carnelian and White' since the school's Inauguration Day on October 7, 1868.

== Roster ==
No.	Nat.	Player	Class	Pos	Height	Weight	DoB	Hometown	Previous team
		Charles Brown		F			1882-05-11
		Alexander McDougall		F
		Norton		G
	(United States)	Roger Roberts		D			1872-07-12	Ithaca, New York
		G. A. Smith	Senior	F
	(United States)	Ezra Whitman		D			1880-02-19	Baltimore, Maryland
	(Canada)	Herbert Wood (C)	Sophomore	F			1877-05-10	Sackville, New Brunswick

== Standings ==
1899–1900 Collegiate ice hockey standings
	Intercollegiate							Overall					
	GP	W	L	T	PCT.	GF	GA	GP	W	L	T	GF	GA
Brown	7	1	5	1	.214	17	39	7	1	5	1	17	39
Buffalo	–	–	–	–	–	–	–	–	–	–	–	–	–
Columbia	–	–	–	–	–	–	–	–	–	–	–	–	–
Cornell	1	0	1	0	.000	1	10	1	0	1	0	1	10
Harvard	5	4	1	0	.800	37	12	9	7	1	1	56	18
MIT	3	0	3	0	.000	7	24	5	2	3	0	15	26
Princeton	4	0	3	1	.125	6	26	6	0	5	1	7	33
Western University of Pennsylvania	–	–	–	–	–	–	–	–	–	–	–	–	–
Yale	7	7	0	0	1.000	37	11	14	10	4	0	49	38

== Schedule and results ==
Date	Opponent	Site	Result	Record
Regular Season
March 22	at Buffalo*	Broadway Auditorium • Buffalo, New York	L 1–10	0–1–0
*Non-conference game.
