= 1899–1900 MIT Engineers men's ice hockey season =

- Conference: Independent

Record
- Overall: 2–3–0
- Road: 2–3–0

Coaches and captains
- Captain: Francis Smith

The 1899–1900 MIT Engineers men's ice hockey season was the 2nd season of play for the program.

== Season ==
Students at MIT formed the ice hockey club in November 1899 in order to introduce the game to the entire student body.

The team did not have a head coach but Roger Burr served as team manager and president.

Note: Massachusetts Institute of Technology athletics were referred to as 'Engineers' or 'Techmen' during the first two decades of the 20th century. By 1920 all sports programs had adopted the Engineer moniker.

== Roster ==
No.	Nat.	Player	Class	Pos	Height	Weight	DoB	Hometown	Previous team
		Charles E. Baldwin	Senior	D
	(United States)	Frank A. Hill	Freshman	F			1878-06-13	Hollis, New Hampshire
		Herbert H. Howe	Senior	G
		Austin T. Hyde	Junior	D
		Albert L. Magnitzky	Freshman	C
		Francis F. H. Smith (C)	Sophomore	F
		Arthur K. Trenholme	Junior	F
		Arthur C. Walworth	Graduate	F

== Standings ==
1899–1900 Collegiate ice hockey standings
	Intercollegiate							Overall					
	GP	W	L	T	PCT.	GF	GA	GP	W	L	T	GF	GA
Brown	7	1	5	1	.214	17	39	7	1	5	1	17	39
Buffalo	–	–	–	–	–	–	–	–	–	–	–	–	–
Columbia	–	–	–	–	–	–	–	–	–	–	–	–	–
Cornell	1	0	1	0	.000	1	10	1	0	1	0	1	10
Harvard	5	4	1	0	.800	37	12	9	7	1	1	56	18
MIT	3	0	3	0	.000	7	24	5	2	3	0	15	26
Princeton	4	0	3	1	.125	6	26	6	0	5	1	7	33
Western University of Pennsylvania	–	–	–	–	–	–	–	–	–	–	–	–	–
Yale	7	7	0	0	1.000	37	11	14	10	4	0	49	38

== Schedule and results ==
Date	Opponent	Site	Result	Record
Regular Season
January 11	at Harvard*	Soldiers Field • Boston, Massachusetts	L 1–10	0–1–0
January 14	at Brown*	Aldrich Field Rink • Providence, Rhode Island	L 2–6	0–2–0
February 7	at Harvard*	Soldiers Field • Boston, Massachusetts	L 4–8	0–3–0
February 14	vs. Dorchester Athletic Association*	Franklin Park • Boston, Massachusetts	W 5–1	1–3–0
February 15	vs. Phillips Academy*	Andover, Massachusetts	W 3–1	2–3–0
*Non-conference game.
