= 1905–06 Carnegie Tech Tartans men's ice hockey season =

- Home ice: Duquesne Garden

Record
- Overall: 1–2–0
- Home: 0–2–0
- Neutral: 1–0–0

Coaches and captains
- Captain: Clarence Overend

The 1905–06 Carnegie Tech Tartans men's ice hockey season was the inaugural season of play for the program.

== Season ==
The team played three games during their inaugural season. The team was prepared to play more matches but scheduling opponents was an issue.

== Roster ==
No.	Nat.	Player	Class	Pos	Height	Weight	DoB	Hometown	Previous team
		John Charles	Freshman	F
		Thomas DuShane	Sophomore
		John Earle
		Thomas Engstrom		G
		J. V. Hall		D
		Walter Hammer	Freshman	LW
		Howard Mason	Freshman	RW
		Frank Miller	Sophomore
		Clarence Overend	Sophomore	D
		Charles Resifar	Freshman	C			1887-06-16

== Standings ==
1905–06 Collegiate ice hockey standings
	Intercollegiate								Overall					
	GP	W	L	T	PCT.	GF	GA		GP	W	L	T	GF	GA
Army	2	1	1	0	.500	9	10		6	5	1	0	30	13
Brown	7	0	7	0	.000	7	37	†	8	0	8	0	7	40
Carnegie Tech	1	0	1	0	.000	0	5		3	1	2	0	2	11
Columbia	5	3	2	0	.600	10	17		12	4	7	1	24	53
Dartmouth	2	1	1	0	.500	7	7		2	1	1	0	7	7
Harvard	4	4	0	0	1.000	18	5		6	5	0	1	35	8
MIT	1	1	0	0	1.000	5	3		2	1	1	0	6	13
Polytechnic Institute of Brooklyn	–	–	–	–	–	–	–		–	–	–	–	–	–
Princeton	5	2	3	0	.400	13	17		13	6	7	0	40	62
Springfield Training	–	–	–	–	–	–	–		–	–	–	–	–	–
Trinity	–	–	–	–	–	–	–		–	–	–	–	–	–
Union	–	–	–	–	–	–	–		2	0	1	1	–	–
Williams	3	0	3	0	.000	9	13		6	2	4	0	16	20
Yale	8	7	1	0	.875	45	8	†	11	7	3	1	55	22
† There is a scoring discrepancy in a game between Brown and Yale. The game was won by Yale either 7–3 or 3–1.

== Schedule and results ==
Date	Opponent	Site	Result	Record
Regular Season
December 30	Yale*	Duquesne Garden • Pittsburgh, Pennsylvania	L 0–5	0–1–0
January 12	Toronto*	Duquesne Garden • Pittsburgh, Pennsylvania	L 1–6 ^{OT}	0–2–0
January 26	vs. All-Collegiate Team*	Duquesne Garden • Pittsburgh, Pennsylvania	W 1–0	1–2–0
*Non-conference game.
