= 1899–1900 Yale Bulldogs men's ice hockey season =

College ice hockey season

Intercollegiate Champion Intercollegiate Hockey Association, Champion
- Conference: 1st IHA

Record
- Overall: 10–4–0
- Conference: 5–0–0
- Road: 5–4–0
- Neutral: 5–0–0

Coaches and captains
- Captain: Shiras Campbell

The 1899–1900 Yale Bulldogs men's ice hockey season was the fifth season of play for the program.

== Season ==
For the second consecutive season, Yale was declared Intercollegiate Hockey League champions, finishing undefeated against all conference opponents.

The team did not have a coach, however, E.A. Strong served as team manager.

Yale played their first game against Harvard, the program that would eventually become their most enduring rival.

== Roster ==
No.	Nat.	Player	Class	Pos	Height	Weight	DoB	Hometown	Previous team
		John P. Brock	Senior	D
		Ezekiel S. Bronson	Senior	F			1878-03-27
	(United States)	Alfred C. Coxe	Junior	D				Utica, New York
		J. Shiras Campbell (C)	Senior	F			1878-10-05
		Fred C. Inman	Sophomore	F
		Robert E. Smith	Graduate	G
	(United States)	Gardner C. Walworth	Senior	F			1878-05-04	Newton Center, Massachusetts

== Standings ==
1899–1900 Collegiate ice hockey standings
	Intercollegiate							Overall					
	GP	W	L	T	PCT.	GF	GA	GP	W	L	T	GF	GA
Brown	7	1	5	1	.214	17	39	7	1	5	1	17	39
Buffalo	–	–	–	–	–	–	–	–	–	–	–	–	–
Columbia	–	–	–	–	–	–	–	–	–	–	–	–	–
Cornell	1	0	1	0	.000	1	10	1	0	1	0	1	10
Harvard	5	4	1	0	.800	37	12	9	7	1	1	56	18
MIT	3	0	3	0	.000	7	24	5	2	3	0	15	26
Princeton	4	0	3	1	.125	6	26	6	0	5	1	7	33
Western University of Pennsylvania	–	–	–	–	–	–	–	–	–	–	–	–	–
Yale	7	7	0	0	1.000	37	11	14	10	4	0	49	38

1899–1900 Intercollegiate Hockey Association standings
	Conference								Overall					
	GP	W	L	T	PTS	GF	GA		GP	W	L	T	GF	GA
Yale	5	5	0	0	8	30	7		14	10	4	0	49	38
Columbia	5	3	2	0	6	21	12		–	–	–	–	–	–
Brown	4	0	3	1	1	9	22	†	7	1	5	1	17	39
Princeton	4	0	3	1	1	6	26	†	6	0	5	1	7	33
† The game between Brown and Princeton was cancelled because neither team could finish better than third place.

== Schedule and results ==
Date	Opponent	Site	Result	Record
Regular season
November 24	at New York Athletic Club*	St. Nicholas Rink • New York, New York	L 0–7	0–1–0
December 2	at St. Nicholas Hockey Club*	St. Nicholas Rink • New York, New York	L 1–3	0–2–0
December 5	at New York Hockey Club*	St. Nicholas Rink • New York, New York	L 0–3	0–3–0
January 1	at Brooklyn Crescents*	Clermont Avenue Skating Rink • Brooklyn, New York	L 1–7	0–4–0
January 3	at Pittsburgh Bankers*	Duquesne Garden • Pittsburgh, Pennsylvania	W 2–1	1–4–0
January 4	at Western University of Pennsylvania*	Duquesne Garden • Pittsburgh, Pennsylvania	W 1–0	2–4–0
January 5	at Duquesne Country and Athletic Club*	Duquesne Garden • Pittsburgh, Pennsylvania	W 3–2	3–4–0
January 6	at Pittsburgh Athletic Club*	Duquesne Garden • Pittsburgh, Pennsylvania	W 5–4	4–4–0
January 19	vs. Princeton	St. Nicholas Rink • New York, New York	W 11–0	5–4–0 (1–0–0)
February 9	vs. Brown	St. Nicholas Rink • New York, New York	W 7–2	6–4–0 (2–0–0)
February 13	vs. Columbia	Clermont Avenue Skating Rink • Brooklyn, New York	W 2–0	7–4–0 (3–0–0)
February 26	vs. Harvard*	St. Nicholas Rink • New York, New York (Rivalry)	W 5–4	8–4–0
March 1	vs. Princeton	Clermont Avenue Skating Rink • Brooklyn, New York	W 5–1	9–4–0 (4–0–0)
March 6	at Columbia	St. Nicholas Rink • New York, New York	W 6–4	10–4–0 (5–0–0)
*Non-conference game.
