= 1905–06 Harvard Crimson men's ice hockey season =

College ice hockey season

Intercollegiate Champion Intercollegiate Hockey Association, Champion
- Conference: 1st IHA
- Home ice: Harvard Stadium Rink

Record
- Overall: 5–0–1
- Conference: 4–0–0
- Home: 2–0–0
- Road: 1–0–1
- Neutral: 2–0–0

Coaches and captains
- Head coach: Alfred Winsor
- Captain: Daniel Newhall

The 1905–06 Harvard Crimson men's ice hockey season was the ninth season of play for the program.

== Season ==
For the fourth straight year Harvard finished undefeated, claiming the intercollegiate title. While their winning streak came to an end at 30 their intercollegiate winning streak was continued at 20 games. Harvard entered the game against Yale with both teams undefeated in conference play. Harvard scored 3 times in the first half but were equaled by the Elis in the second. Because the victory would win the IHA championship the game continued on through four scoreless sessions before Richard Townsend ended the game in the fifth 5-minute overtime. The title game possessed the most overtime periods Harvard has ever played, however, because regulation was only 40 minutes, the game time was swiftly surpassed once the college game shifted to three 20-minute periods.

== Roster ==
| No. | Nat. | Player | Class | Pos | Height | Weight | DoB | Hometown | Previous team |
|---|---|---|---|---|---|---|---|---|---|
| | | Stephen Edgell | Junior | F |
| | | Arnold Fraser-Campbell | Sophomore | F |
| | | Malcolm Ivy | Graduate | G |
| | | Eldon MacLeod | Senior | F | | | 1883-03-18 |
| | (United States) | Daniel Newhall (C) | Senior | D | | | 1884-12-03 | Philadelphia, Pennsylvania |
| | (United States) | Morton Newhall | Sophomore | F | | | 1886-09-15 | Germantown, Pennsylvania |
| | (United States) | Clarence Pell | Sophomore | F | | | 1885-07-29 | Newport, Rhode Island |
| | (United States) | Thompson Sampson | Freshman | D | | | 1886-04-23 | Boston, Massachusetts |
| | (United States) | Richard Townsend | Junior | F | | | 1885-07-27 | Roxbury, Massachusetts |
| | (United States) | Joseph Willetts | Freshman | D | | | 1886-10-17 | Brooklyn, New York |

== Standings ==
1905–06 Collegiate ice hockey standings
| | Intercollegiate | | | | | | | | Overall | | | | | |
| | GP | W | L | T | PCT. | GF | GA | | GP | W | L | T | GF | GA |
|---|---|---|---|---|---|---|---|---|---|---|---|---|---|---|
| Army | 2 | 1 | 1 | 0 | .500 | 9 | 10 | | 6 | 5 | 1 | 0 | 30 | 13 |
| Brown | 7 | 0 | 7 | 0 | .000 | 7 | 37 | † | 8 | 0 | 8 | 0 | 7 | 40 |
| Carnegie Tech | 1 | 0 | 1 | 0 | .000 | 0 | 5 | | 3 | 1 | 2 | 0 | 2 | 11 |
| Columbia | 5 | 3 | 2 | 0 | .600 | 10 | 17 | | 12 | 4 | 7 | 1 | 24 | 53 |
| Dartmouth | 2 | 1 | 1 | 0 | .500 | 7 | 7 | | 2 | 1 | 1 | 0 | 7 | 7 |
| Harvard | 4 | 4 | 0 | 0 | 1.000 | 18 | 5 | | 6 | 5 | 0 | 1 | 35 | 8 |
| MIT | 1 | 1 | 0 | 0 | 1.000 | 5 | 3 | | 2 | 1 | 1 | 0 | 6 | 13 |
| Polytechnic Institute of Brooklyn | – | – | – | – | – | – | – | | – | – | – | – | – | – |
| Princeton | 5 | 2 | 3 | 0 | .400 | 13 | 17 | | 13 | 6 | 7 | 0 | 40 | 62 |
| Springfield Training | – | – | – | – | – | – | – | | – | – | – | – | – | – |
| Trinity | – | – | – | – | – | – | – | | – | – | – | – | – | – |
| Union | – | – | – | – | – | – | – | | 2 | 0 | 1 | 1 | – | – |
| Williams | 3 | 0 | 3 | 0 | .000 | 9 | 13 | | 6 | 2 | 4 | 0 | 16 | 20 |
| Yale | 8 | 7 | 1 | 0 | .875 | 45 | 8 | † | 11 | 7 | 3 | 1 | 55 | 22 |
† There is a scoring discrepancy in a game between Brown and Yale. The game was won by Yale either 7–3 or 3–1.

1905–06 Intercollegiate Hockey Association standings
| | Conference | | | | | | | Overall | | | | | |
| | GP | W | L | T | PTS | GF | GA | GP | W | L | T | GF | GA |
|---|---|---|---|---|---|---|---|---|---|---|---|---|---|
| Harvard * | 4 | 4 | 0 | 0 | 8 | 18 | 5 | 6 | 5 | 0 | 1 | 35 | 8 |
| Yale | 4 | 3 | 1 | 0 | 6 | 19 | 4 | 11 | 7 | 3 | 1 | 55 | 22 |
| Columbia | 4 | 2 | 2 | 0 | 4 | 6 | 14 | 12 | 4 | 7 | 1 | 24 | 53 |
| Princeton | 4 | 1 | 3 | 0 | 2 | 9 | 14 | 13 | 6 | 7 | 0 | 40 | 62 |
| Brown | 4 | 0 | 4 | 0 | 0 | 5 | 20 | 8 | 0 | 8 | 0 | 7 | 40 |
* indicates conference champion

== Schedule and results ==
| Date | Opponent | Site | Result | Record |
Regular Season
| January 13 | at Columbia | St. Nicholas Rink • New York, New York | W 7–0 | 1–0–0 (1–0–0) |
| January 20 | vs. Princeton | St. Nicholas Rink • New York, New York | W 3–2 | 2–0–0 (2–0–0) |
| February 3 | vs. Roxbury Hockey Club* | Harvard Stadium Rink • Boston, Massachusetts | W 15–1 | 3–0–0 |
| February 7 | Brown | Harvard Stadium Rink • Boston, Massachusetts | W 4–0 | 4–0–0 (3–0–0) |
| February 12 | at St. Paul's School* | Concord, New Hampshire | T 2–2 ^{2OT} | 4–0–1 |
| February 18 | vs. Yale | St. Nicholas Rink • New York, New York (Rivalry) | W 4–3 ^{5OT} | 5–0–1 (4–0–0) |
*Non-conference game.

== Scoring Statistics ==
| Name | Position | Games | Goals |
|---|---|---|---|
| Eldon MacLeod | F | 6 | 11 |
| Richard Townsend | F | 5 | 8 |
| Clarence Pell | F | 6 | 7 |
| Morton Newhall | F | 6 | 5 |
| Daniel Newhall | D | 6 | 3 |
| Arnold Fraser-Campbell | F | 2 | 1 |
| Stephen Edgell | F | 1 | 0 |
| Thompson Sampson | D | 2 | 0 |
| Joseph Willetts | D | 5 | 0 |
| Malcolm Ivy | G | 6 | 0 |
| Total | | | 35 |

Note: Assists were not recorded as a statistic.
