= 1916–17 Colgate men's ice hockey season =

Record
- Overall: 2–1–0
- Home: 1–0–0
- Road: 1–1–0

Coaches and captains
- Captain: Michael Hayes

The 1916–17 Colgate men's ice hockey season was the 2nd season of play for the program.

== Season ==
Colgate increased their season schedule to three games and played one of the upper echelon teams, losing 3–7 to Yale.

Due to World War I, Colgate did not field a team the following year and would not restart their program until 1920.

Note: Colgate's athletic teams did not have a moniker until 'Red Raiders' was adopted in 1932.

== Roster ==
No.	Nat.	Player	Class	Pos	Height	Weight	DoB	Hometown	Previous team
	(United States)	Michael J. Hayes (C)	Junior					Youngstown, Ohio

== Standings ==
1916–17 Collegiate ice hockey standings
	Intercollegiate							Overall					
	GP	W	L	T	PCT.	GF	GA	GP	W	L	T	GF	GA
Army	7	4	3	0	.571	18	15	11	6	5	0	31	21
Colgate	3	2	1	0	.667	14	10	3	2	1	0	14	10
Dartmouth	7	6	1	0	.857	20	9	10	7	3	0	26	16
Harvard	8	5	3	0	.625	23	9	12	8	4	0	39	18
Massachusetts Agricultural	8	3	3	2	.500	22	15	8	3	3	2	22	15
MIT	7	2	4	1	.357	17	26	7	2	4	1	17	26
New York State	–	–	–	–	–	–	–	–	–	–	–	–	–
Princeton	8	4	4	0	.500	18	21	10	5	5	0	26	27
Rensselaer	6	2	4	0	.333	10	21	6	2	4	0	10	21
Williams	6	2	3	1	.417	15	13	7	2	4	1	17	17
Yale	11	7	4	0	.636	35	24	14	10	4	0	47	31
YMCA College	–	–	–	–	–	–	–	–	–	–	–	–	–

== Schedule and results ==
Date	Opponent	Site	Result	Record
Regular Season
January 24	at Army*	Stuart Rink • West Point, New York	W 5–2	1–0–0
January 25	at Yale*	New Haven Arena • New Haven, Connecticut	L 3–7	1–1–0
February 17	Rensselaer*	Hamilton, New York	W 6–1	2–1–0
*Non-conference game.
