= 1916–17 Williams Ephs men's ice hockey season =

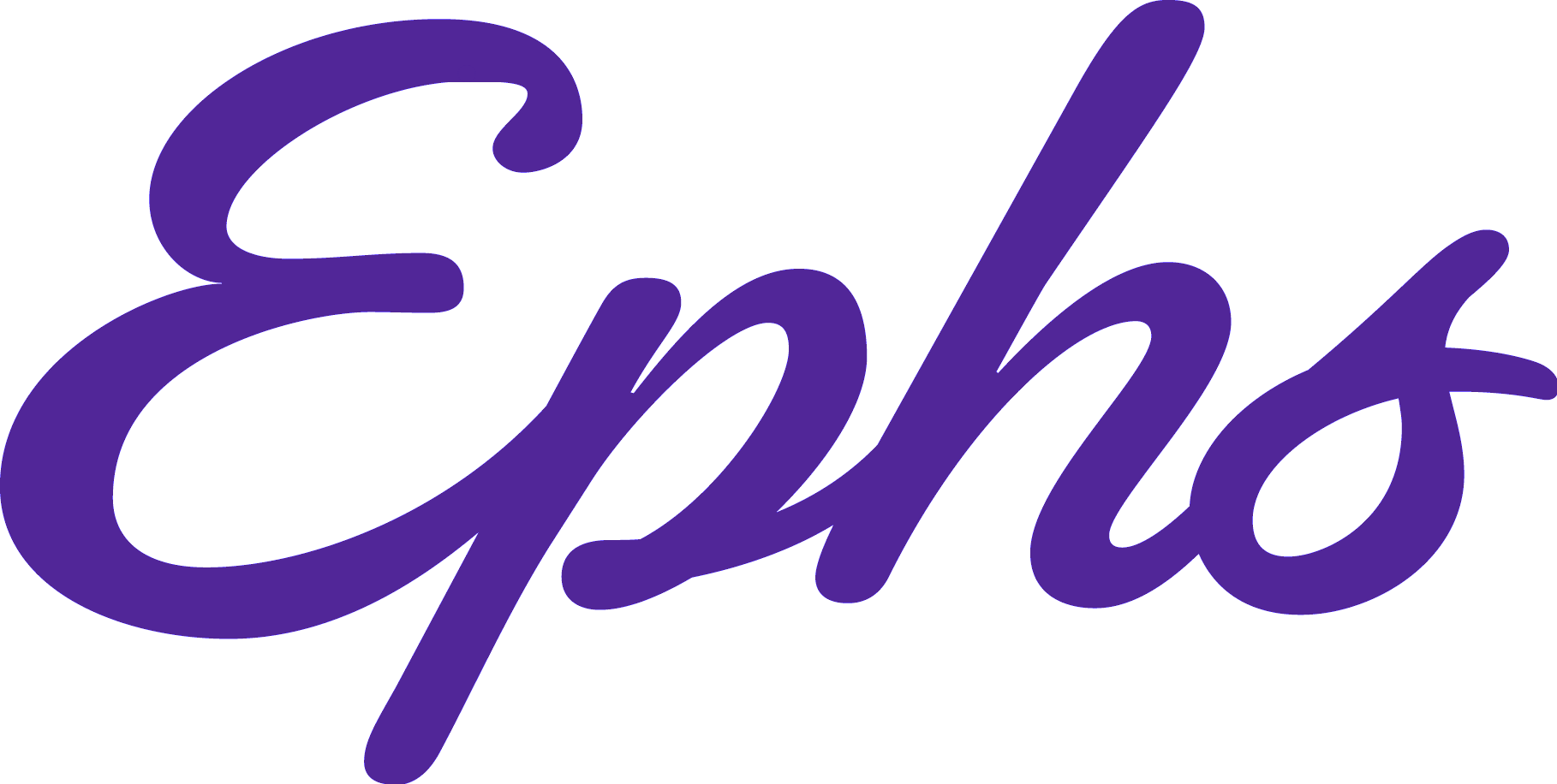
- Home ice: Cole Field House Pond

Record
- Overall: 2–4–1
- Home: 2–1–0
- Road: 0–2–1
- Neutral: 0–1–0

Coaches and captains
- Captain: Thomas Rochester

The 1916–17 Williams Ephs men's ice hockey season was the 14th season of play for the program.

== Roster ==
No.	Nat.	Player	Class	Pos	Height	Weight	DoB	Hometown	Previous team
		Banks		RW
		Brown	Sophomore	D
		Leighton H. Coleman	Junior	C
		Homer Collins Jr.	Sophomore	RW
		Van Note Hatch	Junior	G
		W. Gordon Hegardt	Sophomore	R
		Thomas F. Rochester (C)	Senior	LW

== Standings ==
1916–17 Collegiate ice hockey standings
	Intercollegiate							Overall					
	GP	W	L	T	PCT.	GF	GA	GP	W	L	T	GF	GA
Army	7	4	3	0	.571	18	15	11	6	5	0	31	21
Colgate	3	2	1	0	.667	14	10	3	2	1	0	14	10
Dartmouth	7	6	1	0	.857	20	9	10	7	3	0	26	16
Harvard	8	5	3	0	.625	23	9	12	8	4	0	39	18
Massachusetts Agricultural	8	3	3	2	.500	22	15	8	3	3	2	22	15
MIT	7	2	4	1	.357	17	26	7	2	4	1	17	26
New York State	–	–	–	–	–	–	–	–	–	–	–	–	–
Princeton	8	4	4	0	.500	18	21	10	5	5	0	26	27
Rensselaer	6	2	4	0	.333	10	21	6	2	4	0	10	21
Williams	6	2	3	1	.417	15	13	7	2	4	1	17	17
Yale	11	7	4	0	.636	35	24	14	10	4	0	47	31
YMCA College	–	–	–	–	–	–	–	–	–	–	–	–	–

== Schedule and results ==
Date	Opponent	Site	Result	Record
Regular Season
December 20	vs. Princeton*	St. Nicholas Rink • New York, New York	L 1–2	0–1–0
January 10	at Yale*	New Haven Arena • New Haven, Connecticut	L 2–3	0–2–0
January 20	Rensselaer*	Weston Field Rink • Williamstown, Massachusetts	W 7–1	1–2–0
January 27	at Pittsfield*	Park City Rink • Pittsfield, Massachusetts	L 2–4	1–3–0
February 10	MIT*	Weston Field Rink • Williamstown, Massachusetts	W 3–2	2–3–0
February 16	Dartmouth*	Weston Field Rink • Williamstown, Massachusetts	L 1–4	2–4–0
February 23	at Massachusetts Agricultural*	Alumni Field Rink • Amherst, Massachusetts	T 1–1	2–4–1
*Non-conference game.
