= 1899–1900 Harvard Crimson men's ice hockey season =

College ice hockey season

- Conference: Independent

Record
- Overall: 7–1–1
- Home: 5–0–1
- Road: 2–0–0
- Neutral: 0–1–0

Coaches and captains
- Captain: William Beardsell

The 1899–1900 Harvard Crimson men's ice hockey season was the third season of play for the program.

== Season ==
For the first time Harvard was able to play a more rounded schedule. The Crimson won most of their games and were in contention for the Intercollegiate championship until losing their final game of the season to Yale. The contest against the Bulldogs was the first in what would become college ice hockey's oldest rivalry.

== Roster ==
No.	Nat.	Player	Class	Pos	Height	Weight	DoB	Hometown	Previous team
	(United States)	Albert A. Barrows	Graduate	F			1877-10-13	Providence, Rhode Island
	(United States)	William L. Beardsell (C)	Senior	F
	(United States)	George W. Canterbury	Junior	F			1878-02-25	Boston, Massachusetts
	(United States)	Frederick J. Goodridge	Graduate	F			1873-10-26	Cambridge, Massachusetts
	(United States)	Roger S. Hardy	Junior	F			1878-01-18	Brookline, Massachusetts
	(United States)	William H. Laverack	Junior	F			1879-05-31	Lewiston, New York
	(United States)	Charles C. Rumsey	Sophomore	F			1879-08-29	Buffalo, New York
		Fred A. Russell	Graduate	G			1877-03-16
	(United States)	Wynant D. Vanderpool	Graduate	D			1875-08-15	Newark, New Jersey

== Standings ==
1899–1900 Collegiate ice hockey standings
	Intercollegiate							Overall					
	GP	W	L	T	PCT.	GF	GA	GP	W	L	T	GF	GA
Brown	7	1	5	1	.214	17	39	7	1	5	1	17	39
Buffalo	–	–	–	–	–	–	–	–	–	–	–	–	–
Columbia	–	–	–	–	–	–	–	–	–	–	–	–	–
Cornell	1	0	1	0	.000	1	10	1	0	1	0	1	10
Harvard	5	4	1	0	.800	37	12	9	7	1	1	56	18
MIT	3	0	3	0	.000	7	24	5	2	3	0	15	26
Princeton	4	0	3	1	.125	6	26	6	0	5	1	7	33
Western University of Pennsylvania	–	–	–	–	–	–	–	–	–	–	–	–	–
Yale	7	7	0	0	1.000	37	11	14	10	4	0	49	38

== Schedule and results ==
Date	Opponent	Site	Result	Record
Regular Season
January 11	MIT*	Holmes Field • Boston, Massachusetts	W 10–1	1–0–0
January 13	Canadians*	Soldiers Field • Boston, Massachusetts	W 2–0	2–0–0
January 15	Newtowne Athletic Club*	Soldiers Field • Boston, Massachusetts	T 3–3	2–0–1
January 24	at Brown*	Aldrich Field Rink • Providence, Rhode Island	W 8–1	3–0–1
February 2	Brown*	Soldiers Field • Boston, Massachusetts	W 7–1	4–0–1
February 3	Dorchester Athletic Association*	Franklin Park • Boston, Massachusetts	W 2–0	5–0–1
February 7	MIT*	Soldiers Field • Boston, Massachusetts	W 8–4	6–0–1
February 17	at Brookline Country Club*	Clyde Park • Brookline, Massachusetts	W 10–3	7–0–1
February 24	vs. Yale*	St. Nicholas Rink • New York, New York (Rivalry)	L 4–5	7–1–1
*Non-conference game.
