= 1905–06 Army Cadets men's ice hockey season =

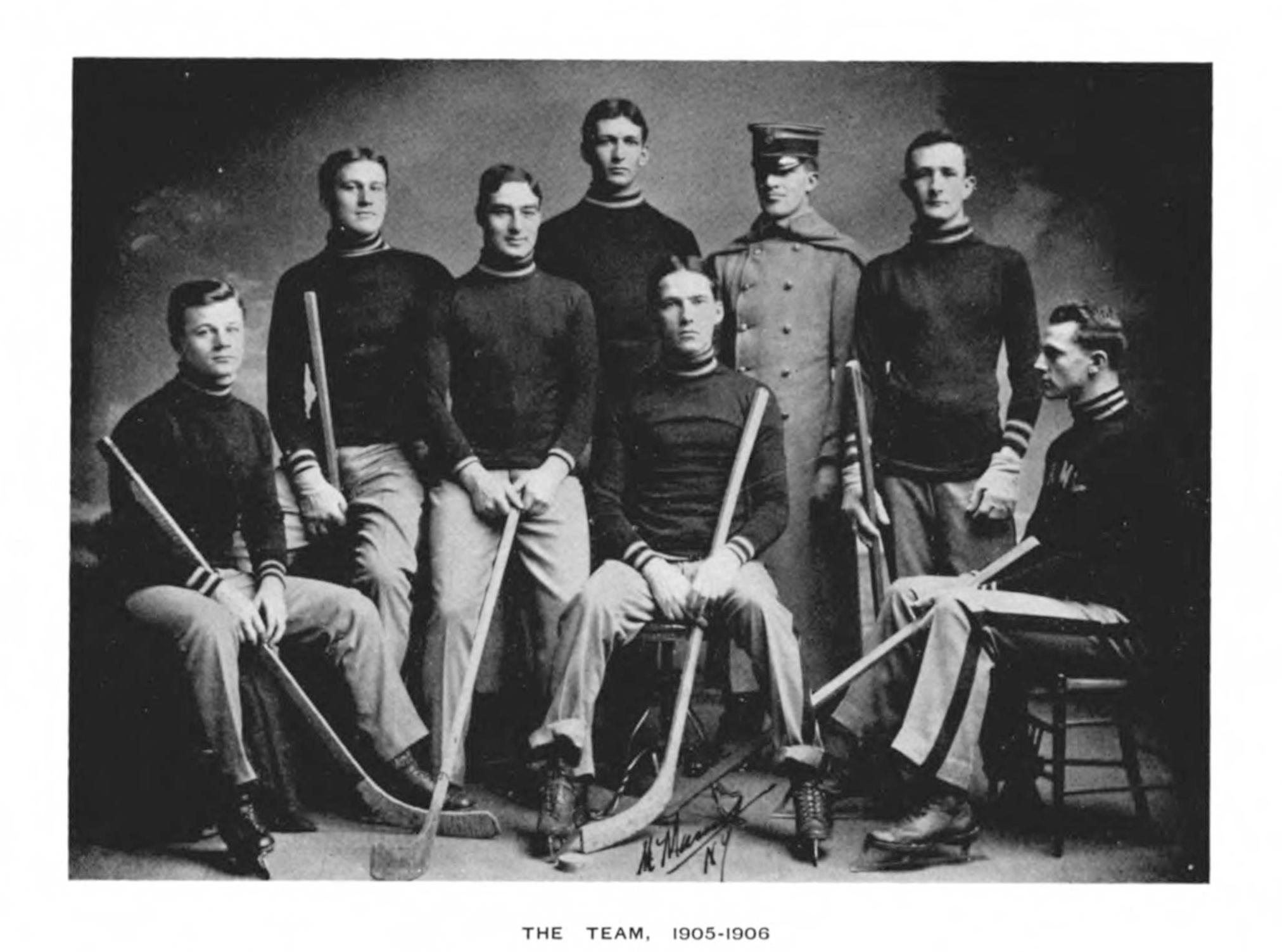
- Conference: Independent
- Home ice: Lusk Reservoir

Record
- Overall: 5–1–0

Coaches and captains
- Head coach: Robert Foy
- Captain: Richard Park

The 1905–06 Army Cadets men's ice hockey season was the 3rd season of play for the program.

== Season ==
For Army's third season of ice hockey, the program played a majority of games against other colleges for the first time.

== Roster ==
No.	Nat.	Player	Class	Pos	Height	Weight	DoB	Hometown	Previous team
	(United States)	Richard Park (C)	Junior				1883-11-20	Malden, Massachusetts

== Standings ==
1905–06 Collegiate ice hockey standings
	Intercollegiate								Overall					
	GP	W	L	T	PCT.	GF	GA		GP	W	L	T	GF	GA
Army	2	1	1	0	.500	9	10		6	5	1	0	30	13
Brown	7	0	7	0	.000	7	37	†	8	0	8	0	7	40
Carnegie Tech	1	0	1	0	.000	0	5		3	1	2	0	2	11
Columbia	5	3	2	0	.600	10	17		12	4	7	1	24	53
Dartmouth	2	1	1	0	.500	7	7		2	1	1	0	7	7
Harvard	4	4	0	0	1.000	18	5		6	5	0	1	35	8
MIT	1	1	0	0	1.000	5	3		2	1	1	0	6	13
Polytechnic Institute of Brooklyn	–	–	–	–	–	–	–		–	–	–	–	–	–
Princeton	5	2	3	0	.400	13	17		13	6	7	0	40	62
Springfield Training	–	–	–	–	–	–	–		–	–	–	–	–	–
Trinity	–	–	–	–	–	–	–		–	–	–	–	–	–
Union	–	–	–	–	–	–	–		2	0	1	1	–	–
Williams	3	0	3	0	.000	9	13		6	2	4	0	16	20
Yale	8	7	1	0	.875	45	8	†	11	7	3	1	55	22
† There is a scoring discrepancy in a game between Brown and Yale. The game was won by Yale either 7–3 or 3–1.

== Schedule and results ==
Date	Opponent	Site	Result	Record
Regular Season
	Kingston Military Academy*	Lusk Reservoir • West Point, New York	W 8–1	1–0–0
	Rensselaer*	Lusk Reservoir • West Point, New York	W 3–2	2–0–0
	Polytechnic Institute of Brooklyn	Lusk Reservoir • West Point, New York	W 2–1	3–0–0 (1–0–0)
	St. Paul's School*	Lusk Reservoir • West Point, New York	W 6–0	4–0–0
	Berkeley College*	Lusk Reservoir • West Point, New York	W 4–0	5–0–0
	Trinity*	Lusk Reservoir • West Point, New York	L 7–9	5–1–0 (1–1–0)
*Non-conference game.
