= 1905–06 Princeton Tigers men's ice hockey season =

College ice hockey season

- Conference: 4th IHA

Record
- Overall: 6–7–0
- Conference: 1–3–0
- Road: 3–4–0
- Neutral: 3–3–0

Coaches and captains
- Captain: Afton Zahniser

The 1905–06 Princeton Tigers men's ice hockey season was the 7th season of play for the program.

== Season ==
After a poor season, Princeton returned to a more normal 13-game slate and rebounded with six victories.

== Roster ==
No.	Nat.	Player	Class	Pos	Height	Weight	DoB	Hometown	Previous team
		Oscar Auerbach	Freshman	F
		Richard Chapman	Junior	D
		Philip Chew	Junior	F
		John Chislett	Junior	G
		Charles Coxe	Freshman	F
	(United States)	Edward A. Dillon	Freshman	F			1882-11-01	Lawrence, Massachusetts
		Chester Levis	Junior	F
		Ralph Osborne	Sophomore	F
		Harral Tenney	Junior	D
		Afton Zahniser (C)	Junior	D

== Standings ==
1905–06 Collegiate ice hockey standings
	Intercollegiate								Overall					
	GP	W	L	T	PCT.	GF	GA		GP	W	L	T	GF	GA
Army	2	1	1	0	.500	9	10		6	5	1	0	30	13
Brown	7	0	7	0	.000	7	37	†	8	0	8	0	7	40
Carnegie Tech	1	0	1	0	.000	0	5		3	1	2	0	2	11
Columbia	5	3	2	0	.600	10	17		12	4	7	1	24	53
Dartmouth	2	1	1	0	.500	7	7		2	1	1	0	7	7
Harvard	4	4	0	0	1.000	18	5		6	5	0	1	35	8
MIT	1	1	0	0	1.000	5	3		2	1	1	0	6	13
Polytechnic Institute of Brooklyn	–	–	–	–	–	–	–		–	–	–	–	–	–
Princeton	5	2	3	0	.400	13	17		13	6	7	0	40	62
Springfield Training	–	–	–	–	–	–	–		–	–	–	–	–	–
Trinity	–	–	–	–	–	–	–		–	–	–	–	–	–
Union	–	–	–	–	–	–	–		2	0	1	1	–	–
Williams	3	0	3	0	.000	9	13		6	2	4	0	16	20
Yale	8	7	1	0	.875	45	8	†	11	7	3	1	55	22
† There is a scoring discrepancy in a game between Brown and Yale. The game was won by Yale either 7–3 or 3–1.

1905–06 Intercollegiate Hockey Association standings
	Conference							Overall					
	GP	W	L	T	PTS	GF	GA	GP	W	L	T	GF	GA
Harvard *	4	4	0	0	8	18	5	6	5	0	1	35	8
Yale	4	3	1	0	6	19	4	11	7	3	1	55	22
Columbia	4	2	2	0	4	6	14	12	4	7	1	24	53
Princeton	4	1	3	0	2	9	14	13	6	7	0	40	62
Brown	4	0	4	0	0	5	20	8	0	8	0	7	40
* indicates conference champion

== Schedule and results ==
Date	Opponent	Site	Result	Record
Regular Season
December 12	at Brooklyn Crescents*	St. Nicholas Rink • New York, New York	L 1–14	0–1–0
December 16	at St. Nicholas Hockey Club*	St. Nicholas Rink • New York, New York	L 1–10	0–2–0
December 28	vs. Quaker Hockey Club*	Norfolk, Virginia	L 6–7	0–3–0
December 29	vs. Quaker Hockey Club*	Norfolk, Virginia	W 4–3	1–3–0
December 30	vs. Quaker Hockey Club*	Norfolk, Virginia	W 5–0	2–3–0
January 3	at New York Athletic Club*	St. Nicholas Rink • New York, New York	L 2–5	2–4–0
January 6	at Columbia	St. Nicholas Rink • New York, New York	L 2–4	2–5–0 (0–1–0)
January 10	vs. Brown	St. Nicholas Rink • New York, New York	W 5–4 ^{4OT}	3–5–0 (1–1–0)
January 20	vs. Harvard	St. Nicholas Rink • New York, New York	L 2–3	3–6–0 (1–2–0)
February 7	at St. Nicholas Hockey Club*	St. Nicholas Rink • New York, New York	W 3–2	4–6–0
February 8	at Albany Hockey Club*	Empire Rink • Albany, New York	W 5–4	5–6–0
February 9	vs. Williams*	Empire Rink • Albany, New York	W 4–3	6–6–0
February 10	vs. Yale	St. Nicholas Rink • New York, New York	L 0–3	6–7–0 (1–3–0)
*Non-conference game.
