= 1899–1900 Columbia men's ice hockey season =

- Conference: 2nd IHA
- Home ice: St. Nicholas Rink

Record
- Overall: 3–2–0
- Conference: 3–2–0

Coaches and captains
- Captain: Arthur Henderson

The 1899–1900 Columbia men's ice hockey season was the 4th season of play for the program.

== Season ==
Note: Columbia University adopted the Lion as its mascot in 1910.

== Roster ==
No.	Nat.	Player	Class	Pos	Height	Weight	DoB	Hometown	Previous team
		Allan Coggeshall	Freshman	F
	(United States)	George G. DeWitt	Freshman	F			1879-07-14	Mainesburg, Pennsylvania
		George A. Eyer	Junior	R
	(United States)	Albert H. Gieschen	Senior	G				New York, New York
		Arthur M. Henderson (C)	Junior	F
		Augustine N. Lawrence	Junior	D
	(United States)	Frank X. O'Dwyer	Freshman	D			1876-09-11	New York City
		Weekes		D
		Arthur M. Wolff	Freshman	F			1881-08-03

== Standings ==
1899–1900 Collegiate ice hockey standings
	Intercollegiate							Overall					
	GP	W	L	T	PCT.	GF	GA	GP	W	L	T	GF	GA
Brown	7	1	5	1	.214	17	39	7	1	5	1	17	39
Buffalo	–	–	–	–	–	–	–	–	–	–	–	–	–
Columbia	–	–	–	–	–	–	–	–	–	–	–	–	–
Cornell	1	0	1	0	.000	1	10	1	0	1	0	1	10
Harvard	5	4	1	0	.800	37	12	9	7	1	1	56	18
MIT	3	0	3	0	.000	7	24	5	2	3	0	15	26
Princeton	4	0	3	1	.125	6	26	6	0	5	1	7	33
Western University of Pennsylvania	–	–	–	–	–	–	–	–	–	–	–	–	–
Yale	7	7	0	0	1.000	37	11	14	10	4	0	49	38

1899–1900 Intercollegiate Hockey Association standings
	Conference								Overall					
	GP	W	L	T	PTS	GF	GA		GP	W	L	T	GF	GA
Yale	5	5	0	0	8	30	7		14	10	4	0	49	38
Columbia	5	3	2	0	6	21	12		–	–	–	–	–	–
Brown	4	0	3	1	1	9	22	†	7	1	5	1	17	39
Princeton	4	0	3	1	1	6	26	†	6	0	5	1	7	33
† The game between Brown and Princeton was cancelled because neither team could finish better than third place.

== Schedule and results ==
Date	Opponent	Site	Result	Record
Regular Season
January 9	Princeton	St. Nicholas Rink • New York, New York	W 6–1	1–0–0 (1–0–0)
January 27	Brown	St. Nicholas Rink • New York, New York	W 7–2	2–0–0 (2–0–0)
February 13	vs. Yale	Clermont Avenue Skating Rink • Brooklyn, New York	L 0–2	2–1–0 (2–1–0)
February 23	Brown	St. Nicholas Rink • New York, New York	W 4–1	3–1–0 (3–1–0)
March 6	Yale	St. Nicholas Rink • New York, New York	L 4–6	3–2–0 (3–2–0)
*Non-conference game.
