= 1899–1900 Princeton Tigers men's ice hockey season =

College ice hockey season

- Conference: T–3rd IHA

Record
- Overall: 0–5–1
- Conference: 0–3–1
- Road: 0–1–0
- Neutral: 0–4–1

Coaches and captains
- Captain: Frederick Ford

The 1899–1900 Princeton Tigers men's ice hockey season was the inaugural season of play for the program.

== Season ==
Princeton joined the Intercollegiate Hockey Association, replacing the spot previously held by Pennsylvania. While the Tigers did not win any games they were competitive in several and the team got progressively better as the year went along.

== Roster ==
No.	Nat.	Player	Class	Pos	Height	Weight	DoB	Hometown	Previous team
		Archibald Alexander	Sophomore	F/D
		Douglas Bonner	Sophomore	F
		Duncan Edwards	Senior	F
		Frederick Ford (C)	Senior	D
		Howard Homans	Junior	F
	(United States)	Raymond D. Little	Junior	F/D			1880-01-05	New York, New York
		Montgomery Ogden	Sophomore	F
		George Paull	Freshman	G
		Gresham Poe	Sophomore	F
	(United States)	Lyttleton Purnell	Freshman				1880-11-15	Baltimore, Maryland
		Wilson	Sophomore	G

== Standings ==
1899–1900 Collegiate ice hockey standings
	Intercollegiate							Overall					
	GP	W	L	T	PCT.	GF	GA	GP	W	L	T	GF	GA
Brown	7	1	5	1	.214	17	39	7	1	5	1	17	39
Buffalo	–	–	–	–	–	–	–	–	–	–	–	–	–
Columbia	–	–	–	–	–	–	–	–	–	–	–	–	–
Cornell	1	0	1	0	.000	1	10	1	0	1	0	1	10
Harvard	5	4	1	0	.800	37	12	9	7	1	1	56	18
MIT	3	0	3	0	.000	7	24	5	2	3	0	15	26
Princeton	4	0	3	1	.125	6	26	6	0	5	1	7	33
Western University of Pennsylvania	–	–	–	–	–	–	–	–	–	–	–	–	–
Yale	7	7	0	0	1.000	37	11	14	10	4	0	49	38

1899–1900 Intercollegiate Hockey Association standings
	Conference								Overall					
	GP	W	L	T	PTS	GF	GA		GP	W	L	T	GF	GA
Yale	5	5	0	0	8	30	7		14	10	4	0	49	38
Columbia	5	3	2	0	6	21	12		–	–	–	–	–	–
Brown	4	0	3	1	1	9	22	†	7	1	5	1	17	39
Princeton	4	0	3	1	1	6	26	†	6	0	5	1	7	33
† The game between Brown and Princeton was cancelled because neither team could finish better than third place.

== Schedule and results ==
Date	Opponent	Site	Result	Record
Regular Season
January 6	vs. Naval Reserves*	St. Nicholas Rink • New York, New York	L 1–2	0–1–0
January 9	vs. Columbia	Clermont Avenue Skating Rink • Brooklyn, New York	L 1–6	0–2–0 (0–1–0)
January 19	vs. Yale	St. Nicholas Rink • New York, New York	L 0–11	0–3–0 (0–2–0)
January 20	at New York Athletic Club*	St. Nicholas Rink • New York, New York	L 0–5	0–4–0
February 24	vs. Brown	St. Nicholas Rink • New York, New York	T 4–4 ^{OT}	0–4–1 (0–2–1)
March 3	vs. Yale	Clermont Avenue Skating Rink • Brooklyn, New York	L 1–5	0–5–1 (0–3–1)
*Non-conference game.

== Scoring Statistics ==
Name	Position	Games	Goals
Aarchibald Alexander	F/D	6	1
Douglas Bonner	F	1	1
Duncan Edwards	F	2	1
Montgomery Ogden	F	2	1
Gresham Poe	F	5	1
Howard Homans	F	6	1
Raymond D. Little	F/D	6	1
Wilson	G	2	0
Lyttleton Purnell	F	3	0
George Paull	G	4	0
Frederick Ford	D	6	0
Total			7

Note: Assists were not recorded as a statistic.
