= Holcomb York =

American ice hockey player

Biographical details
- Born: May 4, 1895; New Haven, Connecticut, US
- Died: July 11, 1979 (aged 84); New Haven, Connecticut, US
- Education: Yale University

Playing career
- 1914–1917: Yale
- Position: Goaltender

Coaching career (HC unless noted)
- 1922–1925: Yale (asst.)
- 1929–1930: Yale JV
- 1930–1938: Yale

Head coaching record
- Overall: 78–66–5 (.540)

Accomplishments and honors

Championships
- 1931 East Intercollegiate Champion

Holcomb York was an American ice hockey Goaltender and coach. He led Yale's varsity program for eight seasons, leading them to an intercollegiate championship in 1931.

== Career ==
Holcomb York began attending Yale University in the fall of 1913 after graduating from Hotchkiss School. After playing on the school's freshman ice hockey team in his first year, York joined the varsity squad and became the starting goaltender as a sophomore in the latter half of the year. He remained in goal for the following two seasons and was regarded as the best goaltender in the country at the time. After graduating, York remained in the area and would later join the university as an assistant coach, helping them capture two intercollegiate titles in the 1920s.

He returned for a third time in 1929, taking over as the head coach for the first junior varsity team in school history. A year later, he accepted the head coaching position after the departure of Lawrence Noble. York inherited a program that had won back-to-back championships but had also lost several of its top players to graduation. Despite the inconvenience, he was able to lead the team to another championship in his first season, as well as an undefeated record against collegiate opponents. Yale remained one of the top college teams over the next several years but York was unable to win a second championship. In 1935–36 the team took a sudden turn downward and posted its first losing season in a decade. The succeeding two years saw only modest improvements and rumors began to swirl about York's job.

Even after winning the big three title by downing Harvard and Princeton, the school was unhappy with the state of the team, though he remained popular with the players and the student body. Immediately after the season, Malcolm Farmer, chairman of the athletic association, announced that he was hiring former NHLer Murray Murdoch as the team's assistant coach. At the time, Farmer insisted that the school was not putting any pressure on York to resign but also that they believed York's real estate business in the Virgin Islands may cause the coach to be called away from the team in future years. Less than a month after that announcement, York abruptly resigned as head coach. The New York Herald Tribune had reported that York had been given an ultimatum that if he did not resign, he would be reassigned to an advisory role without pay. The article expressed the belief that Murdoch had been given prior assurances that he would be head coach by the start of the following season. Farmer denied the accusations.

== Career statistics ==
			Regular season
Season	Team	League	GP	W	L	T	MIN	GA	SO	GAA	SV%
1914–15	Yale	IHL	9	5	4	0	380	20	0	2.11	—
1915–16	Yale	IHL	—	—	—	—	—	—	—	—	—
1916–17	Yale	IHL	—	—	—	—	—	—	—	—	—

== Head coaching record ==
Record table
Season	Team	Overall	Conference	Standing	Postseason
Yale Bulldogs Independent (1930–1938)
1930–31	Yale	15–1–1			East Intercollegiate Champion
1931–32	Yale	11–7–2			
1932–33	Yale	11–8–0			
1933–34	Yale	8–8–1			
1934–35	Yale	14–7–0			
1935–36	Yale	6–13–0			
1936–37	Yale	6–11–0			
1937–38	Yale	7–11–1			
Yale:		78–66–5			
Total:		78–66–5			
National champion Postseason invitational champion Conference regular season champion Conference regular season and conference tournament champion Division regular season champion Division regular season and conference tournament champion Conference tournament champion
