= 1916–17 MIT Engineers men's ice hockey season =

- Conference: Independent
- Home ice: Tech Rink

Record
- Overall: 2–4–1
- Home: 1–0–0
- Road: 1–4–1

Coaches and captains
- Captain: Clarence Cochrane

The 1916–17 MIT Engineers men's ice hockey season was the 18th season of play for the program.

== Season ==
The team did not have a head coach but Kenyon Roper served as team manager.

Note: Massachusetts Institute of Technology athletics were referred to as 'Engineers' or 'Techmen' during the first two decades of the 20th century. By 1920 all sports programs had adopted the Engineer moniker.

== Roster ==
No.	Nat.	Player	Class	Pos	Height	Weight	DoB	Hometown	Previous team
	(United States)	William H. Banks Jr.	Sophomore	LW			1897-09-09	Roslindale, Massachusetts	Boston English High School
	(United States)	Meylert Bruner Jr.	Freshman					Minnesota
	(United States)	Richard F. Cashin Jr.	Sophomore	C				Cambridge, Massachusetts	Rindge Technical School
	(United States)	Waldo B. Clark	Sophomore	R			1897-11-12	Belmont, Massachusetts	Somerville High School
		Clarence Cochrane (C)	Senior	D
	(United States)	Elmer L. Johansen	Freshman				1897-08-16	Somerville, Massachusetts
	(United States)	Richard O. Lowengard	Senior	G			1897-01-02	New York, New York	Irving School
	(United States)	Kenneth B. Page	Freshman				1896-06-11	Springfield, Massachusetts
	(United States)	Frederick A. Parker	Sophomore				1897-01-31	Cambridge, Massachusetts	Brookline High School
	(United States)	Mott B. Ross	Freshman	RW			1896-05-02
	(United States)	Chester R. Tutein	Junior	D			1895-05-17	Revere, Massachusetts
	(United States)	Charles H. Watt	Junior	LW			1896-01-15	Lexington, Massachusetts	Lexington High School

== Standings ==
1916–17 Collegiate ice hockey standings
	Intercollegiate							Overall					
	GP	W	L	T	PCT.	GF	GA	GP	W	L	T	GF	GA
Army	7	4	3	0	.571	18	15	11	6	5	0	31	21
Colgate	3	2	1	0	.667	14	10	3	2	1	0	14	10
Dartmouth	7	6	1	0	.857	20	9	10	7	3	0	26	16
Harvard	8	5	3	0	.625	23	9	12	8	4	0	39	18
Massachusetts Agricultural	8	3	3	2	.500	22	15	8	3	3	2	22	15
MIT	7	2	4	1	.357	17	26	7	2	4	1	17	26
New York State	–	–	–	–	–	–	–	–	–	–	–	–	–
Princeton	8	4	4	0	.500	18	21	10	5	5	0	26	27
Rensselaer	6	2	4	0	.333	10	21	6	2	4	0	10	21
Williams	6	2	3	1	.417	15	13	7	2	4	1	17	17
Yale	11	7	4	0	.636	35	24	14	10	4	0	47	31
YMCA College	–	–	–	–	–	–	–	–	–	–	–	–	–

== Schedule and results ==
Date	Opponent	Site	Result	Record
Regular Season
January 8	vs. Harvard*	Boston Arena • Boston, Massachusetts	L 0–8	0–1–0
January 29	at YMCA College*	Pratt Field Rink • Springfield, Massachusetts	W 7–5	1–1–0
January 30	at Massachusetts Agricultural*	Alumni Field Rink • Amherst, Massachusetts	T 0–0 ^{2OT}	1–1–1
January 31	at Army*	Stuart Rink • West Point, New York	L 1–2 ^{OT}	1–2–1
February 3	at Yale*	New Haven Arena • New Haven, Connecticut	L 1–8	1–3–1
February 9	at Williams*	Weston Field Rink • Williamstown, Massachusetts	L 2–3	1–4–1
February 14	YMCA College*	Tech Rink • Cambridge, Massachusetts	W 6–0	2–4–1
February 17	at East Side Skating Club*	Providence, Rhode Island (Exhibition)	L 1–3	
*Non-conference game.
