= 1899–1900 United States collegiate men's ice hockey season =

1899–00 United States collegiate men's ice hockey season
- Duration: December 1899– March 1900
- Collegiate champion: Yale

The 1899–1900 United States collegiate men's ice hockey season was the 6th season of collegiate ice hockey.

Princeton University played several games during the season, however, Princeton's records for its ice hockey team begin with the 1900–01 season.

== Regular season ==
=== Standings ===
1899–1900 Collegiate ice hockey standings
	Intercollegiate							Overall					
	GP	W	L	T	PCT.	GF	GA	GP	W	L	T	GF	GA
Brown	7	1	5	1	.214	17	39	7	1	5	1	17	39
Buffalo	–	–	–	–	–	–	–	–	–	–	–	–	–
Columbia	–	–	–	–	–	–	–	–	–	–	–	–	–
Cornell	1	0	1	0	.000	1	10	1	0	1	0	1	10
Harvard	5	4	1	0	.800	37	12	9	7	1	1	56	18
MIT	3	0	3	0	.000	7	24	5	2	3	0	15	26
Princeton	4	0	3	1	.125	6	26	6	0	5	1	7	33
Western University of Pennsylvania	–	–	–	–	–	–	–	–	–	–	–	–	–
Yale	7	7	0	0	1.000	37	11	14	10	4	0	49	38

1899–1900 Intercollegiate Hockey Association standings
	Conference								Overall					
	GP	W	L	T	PTS	GF	GA		GP	W	L	T	GF	GA
Yale	5	5	0	0	8	30	7		14	10	4	0	49	38
Columbia	5	3	2	0	6	21	12		–	–	–	–	–	–
Brown	4	0	3	1	1	9	22	†	7	1	5	1	17	39
Princeton	4	0	3	1	1	6	26	†	6	0	5	1	7	33
† The game between Brown and Princeton was cancelled because neither team could finish better than third place.
