= 1905–06 United States collegiate men's ice hockey season =

- Duration: December 1905– March 1906
- Collegiate champion: Harvard

The 1905–06 United States collegiate men's ice hockey season was the 12th season of collegiate ice hockey.

Due to a lack of success and home ice facility, Brown suspended its ice hockey team after the season. It would be another 20 years before Brown would field another team.

== Regular season ==
=== Standings ===
1905–06 Collegiate ice hockey standings
	Intercollegiate								Overall					
	GP	W	L	T	PCT.	GF	GA		GP	W	L	T	GF	GA
Army	2	1	1	0	.500	9	10		6	5	1	0	30	13
Brown	7	0	7	0	.000	7	37	†	8	0	8	0	7	40
Carnegie Tech	1	0	1	0	.000	0	5		3	1	2	0	2	11
Columbia	5	3	2	0	.600	10	17		12	4	7	1	24	53
Dartmouth	2	1	1	0	.500	7	7		2	1	1	0	7	7
Harvard	4	4	0	0	1.000	18	5		6	5	0	1	35	8
MIT	1	1	0	0	1.000	5	3		2	1	1	0	6	13
Polytechnic Institute of Brooklyn	–	–	–	–	–	–	–		–	–	–	–	–	–
Princeton	5	2	3	0	.400	13	17		13	6	7	0	40	62
Springfield Training	–	–	–	–	–	–	–		–	–	–	–	–	–
Trinity	–	–	–	–	–	–	–		–	–	–	–	–	–
Union	–	–	–	–	–	–	–		2	0	1	1	–	–
Williams	3	0	3	0	.000	9	13		6	2	4	0	16	20
Yale	8	7	1	0	.875	45	8	†	11	7	3	1	55	22
† There is a scoring discrepancy in a game between Brown and Yale. The game was won by Yale either 7–3 or 3–1.

1905–06 Intercollegiate Hockey Association standings
	Conference							Overall					
	GP	W	L	T	PTS	GF	GA	GP	W	L	T	GF	GA
Harvard *	4	4	0	0	8	18	5	6	5	0	1	35	8
Yale	4	3	1	0	6	19	4	11	7	3	1	55	22
Columbia	4	2	2	0	4	6	14	12	4	7	1	24	53
Princeton	4	1	3	0	2	9	14	13	6	7	0	40	62
Brown	4	0	4	0	0	5	20	8	0	8	0	7	40
* indicates conference champion
