= Intercollegiate Hockey League =

US ice hockey league

- Founded: 1912
- Folded: 1917
- Sports fielded: Ice hockey
- No. of teams: 3
- Region: Northeastern United States

The Intercollegiate Hockey League began as an agreement between Harvard, Princeton and Yale to play one another in best-of-three series.

== History ==
As the Intercollegiate Hockey Association was collapsing, the three top college teams wanted to continue playing games against one another. After Harvard left the IHA in 1911 they scheduled both Princeton and Yale multiple times the following season. After Yale left the next year all three teams agreed to play two games against one another with a third used in case of a tie. After the collapse of the IHA and the suspension of Columbia's ice hockey in 1915, both Cornell and Dartmouth made overtures to join the league but after Cornell was forced to cancel any such plans due to financial constraints, nothing came to fruition for either program.

The league held together for five years before World War I caused both Princeton and Harvard to suspend their programs.

== Members ==
Locations of member teams

Institution	Nickname	Location	Founded	Tenure	Fate	Current conference
Harvard University	Crimson	Boston, Massachusetts	1636	1912–1917	Program suspended	ECAC Hockey
Princeton University	Tigers	Princeton, New Jersey	1746	1912–1917	Program suspended	ECAC Hockey
Yale University	Bulldogs	New Haven, Connecticut	1701	1912–1917	Independent	ECAC Hockey

== See also ==
- Intercollegiate Hockey Association
- Triangular Hockey League
- Pentagonal League
