= 1903–04 Williams Ephs men's ice hockey season =

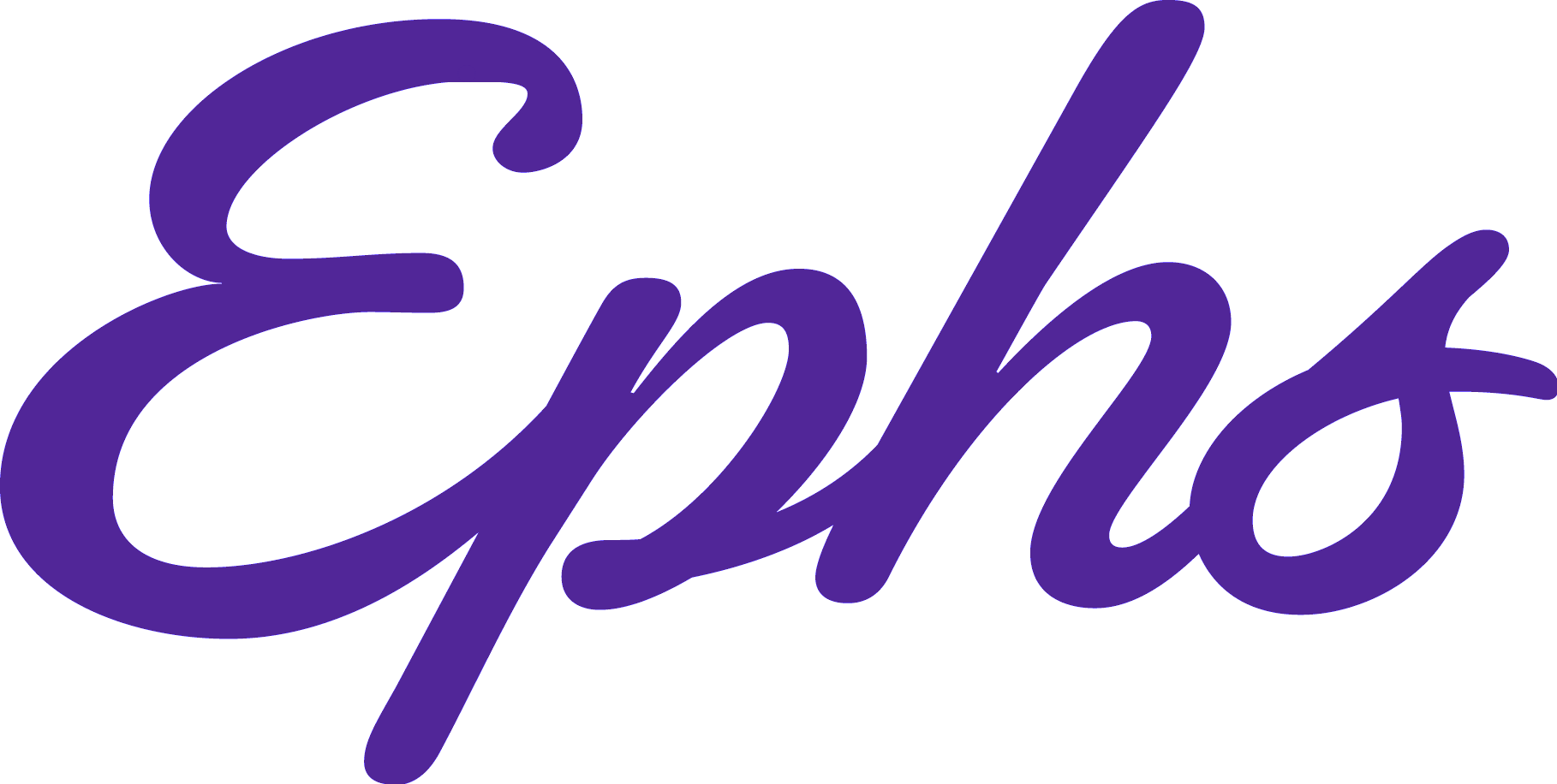
- Home ice: Cole Field House Pond

Record
- Overall: 2–2–0
- Road: 2–2–0

Coaches and captains

The 1903–04 Williams Ephs men's ice hockey season was the 2nd season of play for the program.

== Standings ==
1903–04 Collegiate ice hockey standings
| | Intercollegiate | | | | | | | Overall | | | | | |
| | GP | W | L | T | PCT. | GF | GA | GP | W | L | T | GF | GA |
|---|---|---|---|---|---|---|---|---|---|---|---|---|---|
| Army | 0 | 0 | 0 | 0 | – | 0 | 0 | 6 | 5 | 1 | 0 | 39 | 9 |
| Brown | 4 | 0 | 4 | 0 | .000 | 0 | 21 | 5 | 1 | 4 | 0 | 2 | 22 |
| City College of New York | – | – | – | – | – | – | – | – | – | – | – | – | – |
| Columbia | 6 | 4 | 2 | 0 | .667 | 19 | 8 | 12 | 5 | 6 | 1 | 30 | 32 |
| Cornell | 1 | 0 | 1 | 0 | .000 | 0 | 2 | 1 | 0 | 1 | 0 | 0 | 2 |
| Harvard | 5 | 5 | 0 | 0 | 1.000 | 27 | 5 | 6 | 6 | 0 | 0 | 31 | 6 |
| Princeton | 6 | 2 | 3 | 1 | .417 | 10 | 12 | 12 | 6 | 5 | 1 | 28 | 25 |
| Rensselaer | 1 | 1 | 0 | 0 | 1.000 | 6 | 2 | 1 | 1 | 0 | 0 | 6 | 2 |
| Union | – | – | – | – | – | – | – | 4 | 2 | 2 | 0 | – | – |
| Williams | 0 | 0 | 0 | 0 | – | 0 | 0 | 4 | 2 | 2 | 0 | 11 | 13 |
| Yale | 8 | 4 | 3 | 1 | .563 | 29 | 19 | 10 | 4 | 4 | 2 | 36 | 32 |

== Schedule and results ==
| Date | Opponent | Site | Result | Record |
Regular Season
| December 16 | at Blackinton* | Blackinton, Massachusetts | W 6–0 | 1–0–0 |
| January 13 | vs. Pittsfield High School* | Blackinton, Massachusetts | L 0–4 | 1–1–0 |
| January 16 | at Adams Athletic Association* | Blackinton, Massachusetts | W 2–1 | 2–1–0 |
| January 22 | vs. Collegiates* | Albany, New York | L 3–8 | 2–2–0 |
*Non-conference game.
