= Andrew J. Robinson (builder) =

American builder

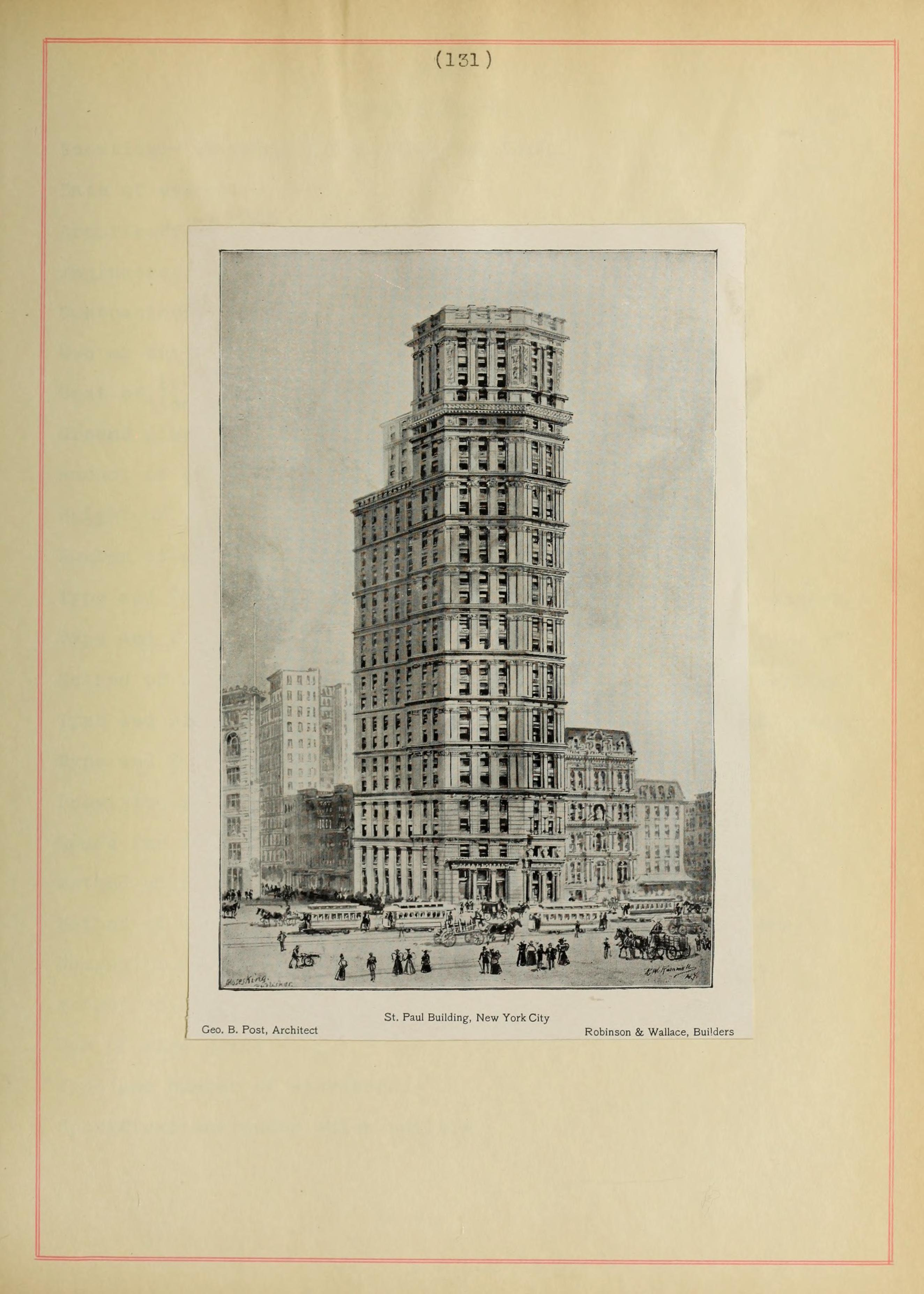
Print of the St. Paul Building from Tall Buildings of Chicago and New York published in 1910

Andrew J. Robinson (died 1922) was a builder in New York City and partner in the firm Robinson & Wallace established in 1872 and later reorganized as the Andrew J. Robinson Company. His firms built St. Luke's Hospital (New York City) (1895), the St. Paul Building (1897), New York Hospital, the Havemeyer Hall (1898), the East River Savings Bank, (Note: It is not currently known whether this is the one at 291 Broadway or the one at 26 Cortlandt Street.) Blair Building, B.F. Goodrich Company Building at 1780 Broadway (1909) and Pabst Hotel (1902). Real Estate Record and Builders' Guide referred to him as one of New York's most prominent builders for more than 50 years in his 1922 obituary.

Robinson was born in Bloomfield, New Jersey and moved to New York City to work as a mason when he was 17.

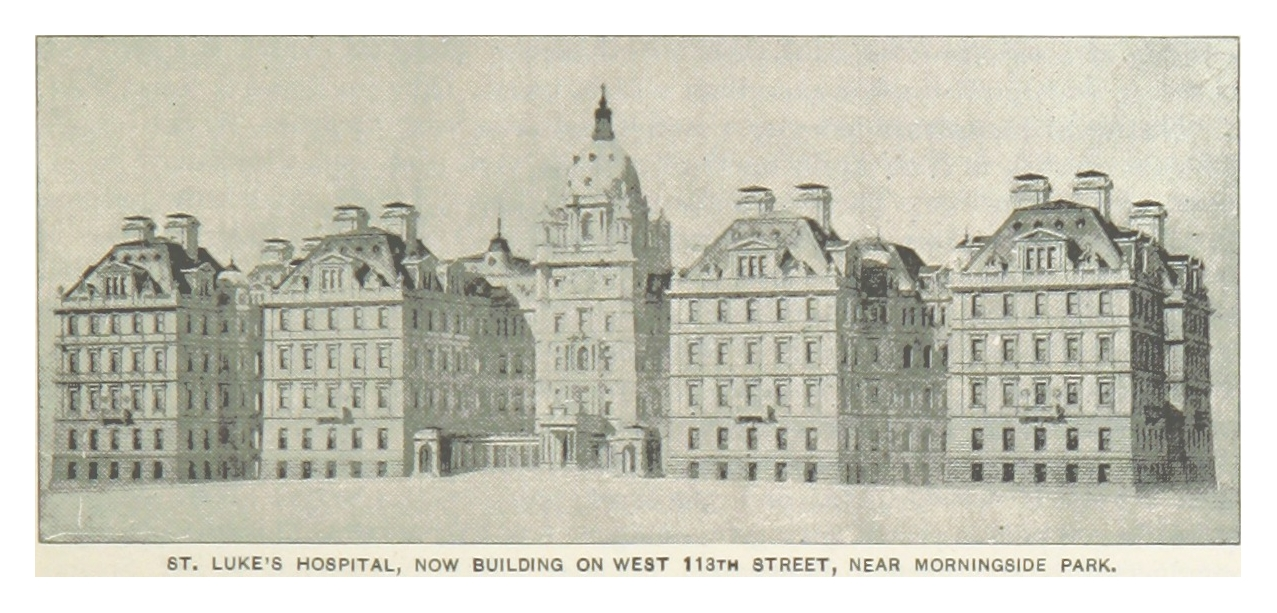
Print of Saint Luke's Hospital at 114th Street

In 1900 The New York Times reported on the company.

Drew King Robinson was his son.

== John J. Clark Home and company reorganization ==
Robinson bought the John J. Clark House at 108 West 73rd Street in March 1900 and turned it into a boarding house. An advertisement boasted "Beautiful steam heated rooms; large closets; every accommodation; parlor dining room; table board." Unfortunately, the St. Luke's Hospital project included a $1 million contract for marble from a quarry in Georgia that failed and Robinson had to buy it in order to fulfill the contract. This drove his company into bankruptcy and No. 108 was auctioned in February 1901. It was purchased by Frank C. Poucher who was the treasurer in the reorganized Andrew J. Robinson Company.

== Other works ==
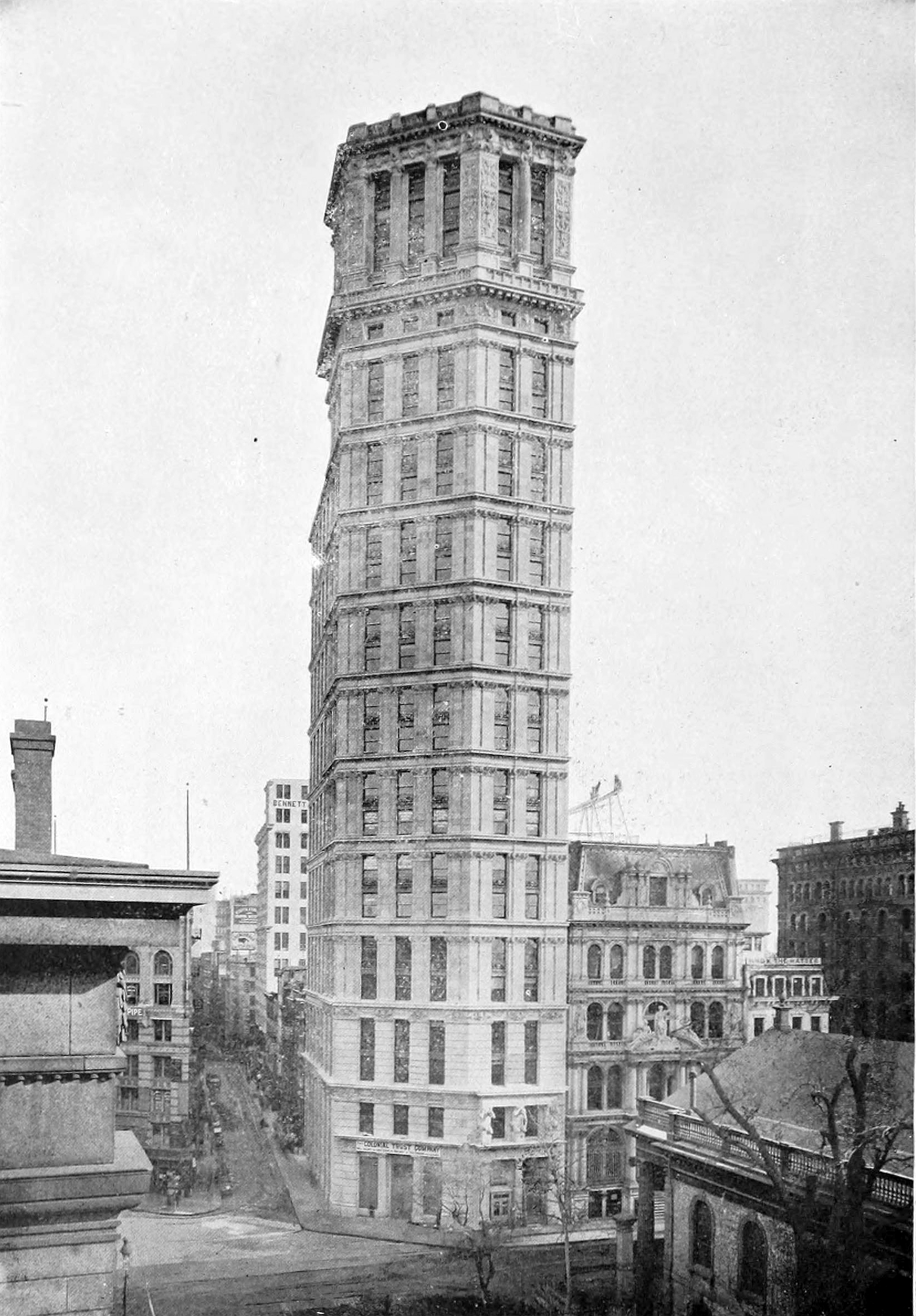
St. Paul Building (1897)

- Columbia County courthouse (1908) at 401 Union Street / Court Street in Hudson, New York. Warren & Wetmore architects. Part of the Hudson Historic District (New York)
- New York Historical Society building (1908) York & Sawyer architects
- Stuyvesant Fish House (78th Street, Manhattan) for Stuyvesant Fish
- Elihu Root residence (ca. 1904) at 733 Park Avenue in New York City demolished ca. 1970. Architects Carrere & Hastings
- Henry Osborne Havemeyer residence (Henry was part of the Havemeyer family)
- Peddie School in Hightstown, New Jersey
- Kerochan Mansion at 824 5th Avenue (demolished)
