= Andrew J. Robinson =

Andrew J. Robinson may refer to:

- Andrew Robinson (actor) (Andrew Jordt Robinson, born 1942), American actor
- Andrew J. Robinson (builder) (died 1922), New York builder
