= Edwin Barlow =

Edwin Barlow may refer to:

- Edwin Barlow (cricketer) (1912–1980), English cricketer
- Edwin Thayer Barlow (1869–1959), American architect
