= Edward Leonard King =

United States Army general

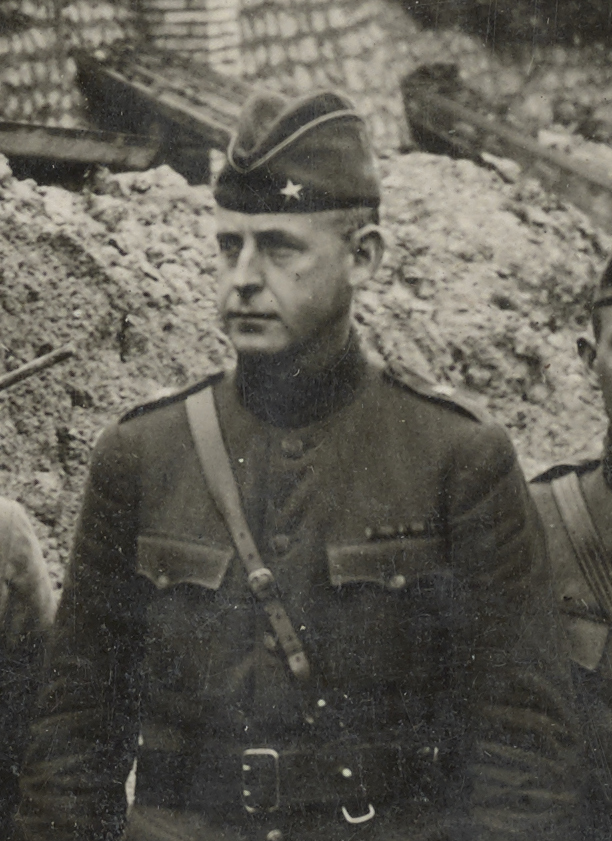
- Born: December 5, 1873; Bridgewater, Massachusetts, U.S.
- Died: December 27, 1933 (aged 60); East Point, Georgia, U.S.
- Burial place: West Point Cemetery, West Point, New York, U.S.
- Military career
- Allegiance: United States
- Branch: United States Army
- Service years: 1896–1933
- Rank: Major General
- Unit: Infantry Branch
- Commands: 65th Brigade; United States Army Cavalry School; United States Army Command and General Staff College
- Awards: Distinguished Service Cross; Distinguished Service Medal; Silver Star; World War I Victory Medal
- Coaching career

Playing career
- 1894–1895: Army
- Position: Halfback

Coaching career (HC unless noted)
- 1903: Army

Head coaching record
- Overall: 6–2–1

Major General Edward Leonard King (December 5, 1873 – December 27, 1933) was an American football player and coach and officer in the United States Army. He played college football as the halfback at the United States Military Academy from 1894 to 1895 and served as the head coach of the Army football team in 1903. King was a career military officer who served in the Spanish–American War and World War I. He was the Commandant of the United States Army Command and General Staff College from 1925 to 1929 and attained the rank of major general.

== Military career ==
King was born in Bridgewater, Massachusetts in 1873 and entered the United States Military Academy (USMA) at West Point, New York in 1892. He played at the halfback position for the Army Black Knights football team from 1894 to 1895. He was also selected captain of the Army football team in 1895. Football historian Parke H. Davis later wrote of King:

Of his foot ball days he is remembered as a swift, elusive, crashing and flashing back; courageous, tenacious and chivalrous; a true soldier of the gridiron as he was of the real battle-fields.

Among his classmates there were several men who would, like King himself, eventually attain the rank of general officer, such as Merch Bradt Stewart, Lucius Roy Holbrook, Dennis E. Nolan, Frank C. Bolles, LeRoy Eltinge and George Henry Shelton. King was then commissioned as a second lieutenant and served in the Spanish–American War. He was awarded the Distinguished Service Cross for service in the Philippines in 1899. The commendation he received with the Distinguished Service Cross stated:

For extraordinary heroism in action near Imus, Cayite Province, Philippine Islands, October 6, 1899, while serving as Captain, United States Cavalry. His great personal bravery in disarming a hostile Filipino saved the life of a brother officer.

In 1903, King returned to West Point and served one year as the head coach of the Army football team. He led the team to a 6–2–1 record in the 1903 college football season. After the season, he agreed to serve as head coach for the academy's ice hockey team in its inaugural year. He also served in the Philippine–American War and served again in the Philippines from January 1910 through June 1912. King graduated from the Army School of the Line in 1913 and the Army Staff College in 1914.

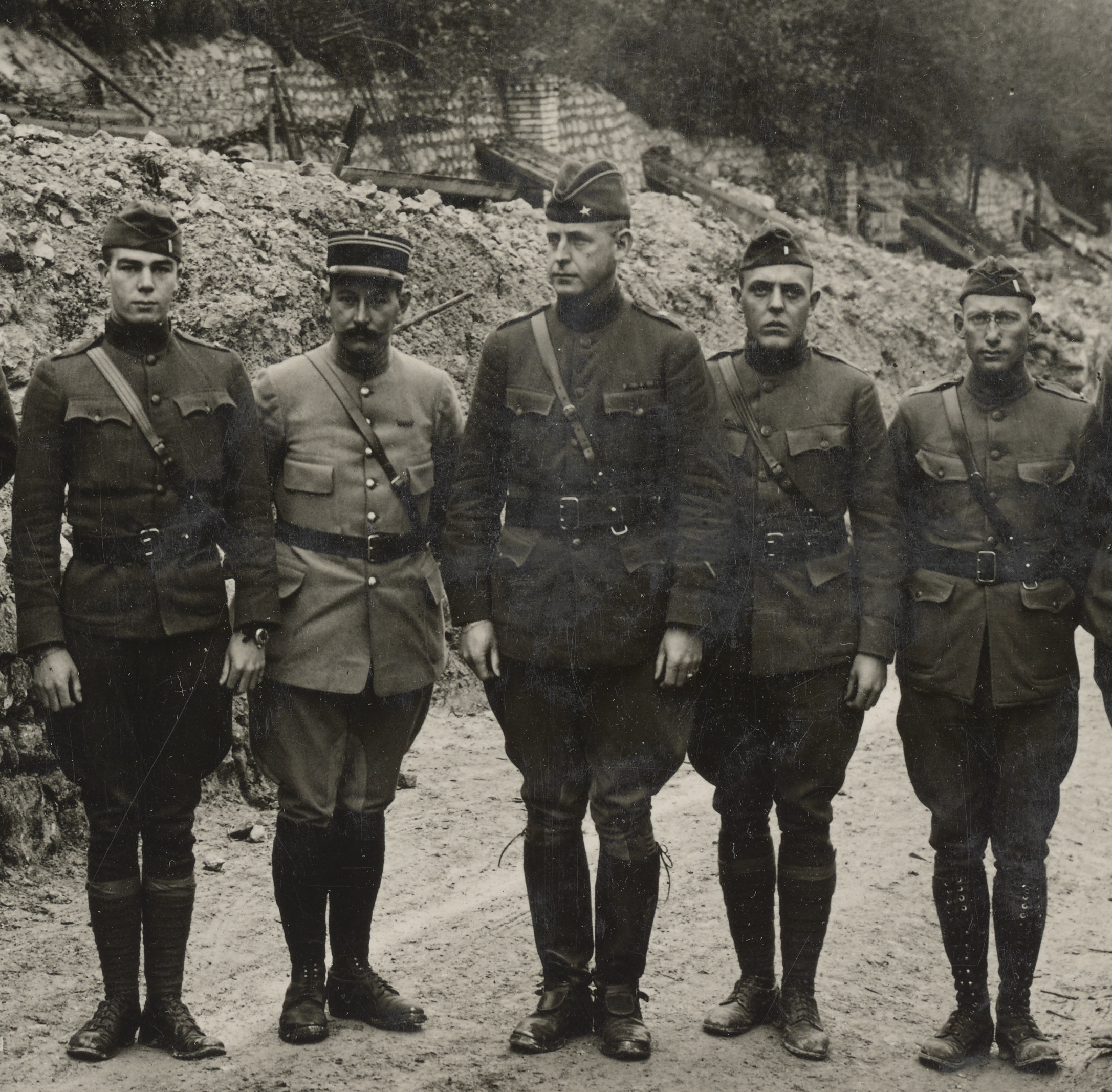
Brigadier General Edward L. King (center) as commander of the 65th Brigade with members of his staff near Mouilly, France, November 1918.

In July 1916 he was promoted to major of the cavalry, and he attended the United States Army War College from September 1916 to May 1917, a month after the American entry into World War I,

Following the American entry into the war, King was promoted to the rank of colonel in the National Army. He was the Chief of Staff of the 28th Division, a National Guard formation known as the "Keystoners," in Camp Hancock, Georgia, and also during part of its campaign in France. He arrived in Europe in May 1918 and was promoted to the rank of brigadier general the following month. He participated in the Marne offensive and counter-offensive starting July 15, 1918, and assumed command the 65th Brigade on July 31, 1918. He led the brigade in the battles of the Somme and Meuse-Argonne. He remained with the Army of Occupation in Luxemburg from December 1918, a month after the Armistice with Germany which ended hostilities, until April 1919 and returned to the United States in 1919.

For his service in World War I, King received the Army Distinguished Service Medal, and France awarded him the Croix de Guerre with palm and made him an officer in the French Legion of Honor. The citation for his Distinguished Service Medal stated:

For exceptionally distinguished and meritorious service. He served with marked distinction as Chief of Staff of the 28th Infantry Division. Later, as brigadier commander he planned and directed the operations resulting in the capture by the 65th Infantry Brigade of Chateau d'Aulnois and Marcheville, where he displayed great tactical skill and demonstrated his abilities as a commander.

King graduated from the Naval War College in 1920. He commanded the Army Cavalry School at Fort Riley, Kansas from 1923 to 1925.

From July 1925 to July 1929, Brigadier General King served as the Commandant of the United States Army Command and General Staff College at Fort Leavenworth, Kansas. He served as assistant chief of staff for the War Department from 1929 to 1932. King was promoted to major general in October 1931.

He married his wife, Nancy Vose Sumner, in 1898; they had one daughter. His wife was the daughter of Brig. Gen. Edwin Vose Sumner Jr.

In December 1933, King died of a heart attack while on a hunt at Fort McPherson, Georgia. He was buried at West Point.

== Head coaching record ==
=== Football ===
Year	Team	Overall	Conference	Standing	Bowl/playoffs
Army Cadets (Independent) (1903)
1903	Army	6–2–1			
Army:		6–2–1			
Total:		6–2–1			

=== Ice hockey ===
Record table
Season	Team	Overall	Conference	Standing	Postseason
Army Cadets Independent (1903–1904)
1903–04	Army	5–1–0			
Army:		5–1–0			
Total:		5–1–0			

== Bibliography ==
- Davis, Henry Blaine Jr. (1998). Generals in Khaki. Raleigh, North Carolina: Pentland Press. ISBN 1571970886. OCLC 40298151.

Military offices
Preceded by Harry A. Smith	Commandant of the United States Army Command and General Staff College; 1925–1929	Succeeded by Stuart Heintzelman
