= USS General M. B. Stewart =

American naval vessel

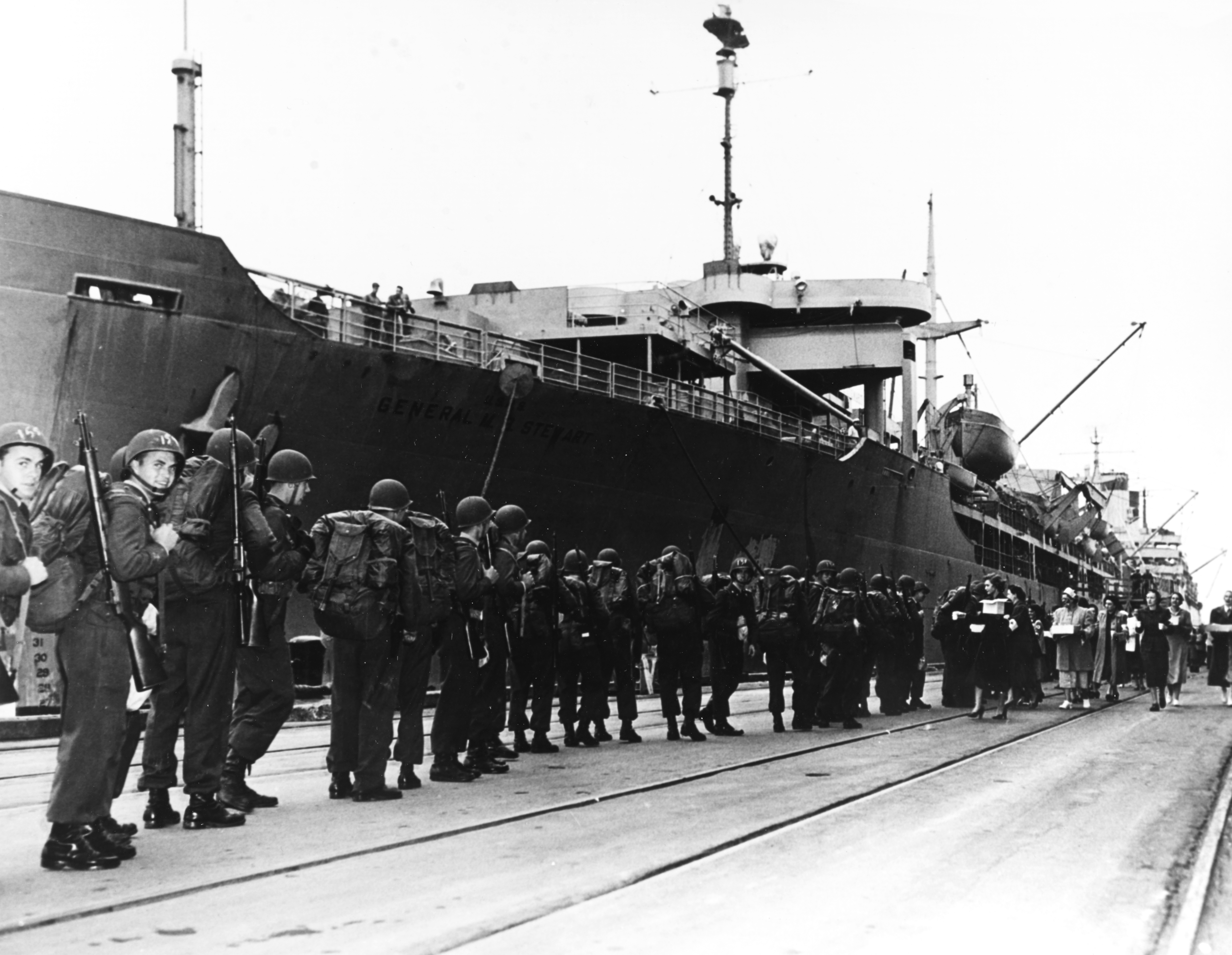
- General M. B. Stewart in 1951

History

United States
- Name: General M. B. Stewart
- Namesake: Merch Bradt Stewart
- Builder: Kaiser Co., Inc.; Richmond, California
- Laid down: date unknown
- Launched: 15 October 1944
- Acquired: 3 March 1945
- Commissioned: 3 March 1945
- Decommissioned: 24 May 1946
- In service: after 24 May 1946 (Army); 1 March 1950 (MSTS)
- Out of service: 1 March 1950 (Army); 29 April 1955 (MSTS)
- Renamed: SS Albany, 1968; Drilling barge Mission Viking, 1974
- Reclassified: T-AP-140, 1 March 1950
- Identification: IMO number: 6810677
- Fate: Scrapped July 1987

General characteristics
- Class & type: General G. O. Squier-class transport ship
- Displacement: 9,950 tons (light), 17,250 tons (full)
- Length: 522 ft 10 in (159.36 m)
- Beam: 71 ft 6 in (21.79 m)
- Draft: 24 ft (7.32 m)
- Propulsion: single-screw steam turbine with 9,900 shp (7,400 kW)
- Speed: 17 knots (31 km/h)
- Capacity: 3595 troops
- Complement: 356 (officers and enlisted)
- Armament: 4 × 5"/38 caliber gun mounts; 4 × 40 mm AA gun mounts; 16 × 20 mm AA gun mounts

USS General M. B. Stewart (AP-140) was a General G. O. Squier-class transport ship for the U.S. Navy in World War II. She was named in honor of U.S. Army general Merch Bradt Stewart. She was transferred to the U.S. Army as USAT General M. B. Stewart in 1946. On 1 March 1950 she was transferred to the Military Sea Transportation Service (MSTS) as USNS General M. B. Stewart (T-AP-140). She was later sold for commercial operation under the name SS Albany, before being scrapped in July 1987.

== Operational history ==
General M. B. Stewart (AP-140) was launched 15 October 1944 under Maritime Commission contract (MC #707) by Kaiser Co., Inc., Yard 3, Richmond, California; sponsored by Mrs. M. B. Stewart; acquired by the Navy and simultaneously commissioned at San Francisco 3 March 1945.

Following shakedown out of San Diego, General M. B. Stewart sailed from San Francisco 2 April 1945 with more than 3,000 troops for Pearl Harbor. After returning to San Francisco 18 April with 1,500 veterans embarked, she made a round-trip voyage out of San Francisco from 26 April to 19 June to transport troops to Pearl Harbor; the Admiralty Islands; and Leyte, Philippine Islands. She then departed San Francisco 26 June for Atlantic operations. Reaching Norfolk 11 July, she sailed the 22d to Leghorn, Italy, where she arrived 5 August to embark troops for redeployment in the Pacific. Underway 7 August for the Panama Canal, General M. B. Stewart steamed for the East Coast after the Japanese capitulation and arrived 19 August to debark her passengers.

Between late August and early November, General M. B. Stewart made two round-trip "Magic-Carpet" voyages to France and a third voyage to India and Ceylon. Departing New York 7 December, she sailed via the Suez Canal to India where she arrived Karachi 28 December to embark 3,300 returning veterans. She sailed 30 December for the United States and arrived Seattle 25 January 1946. From 5 March to 4 April she sailed to Japan with occupation troops and returned to Seattle with military passengers. Sailing for New York 22 April, General M. B. Stewart arrived 11 May and decommissioned 24 May.

The ship was turned over to WSA for duty in Army Transport Service, who rebuilt her to 12,521 gross tons.

On 12 February 1948 USAT General M. B. Stewart arrived in Fremantle, Western Australia with 857 displaced persons from Europe. This voyage was the second of almost 150 "Fifth Fleet" voyages by some 40 ships bringing refugees of World War II to Australia. General M. B. Stewart made four more such trips herself: arriving in Melbourne (from Naples) on 13 April 1949 with 816 refugees; in Adelaide on 20 July 1949 with 816; in Melbourne 30 January 1950 with 1,262; and finally arriving in Sydney on 17 April 1950 with 1,292 displaced persons.

The transport was reacquired by the Navy 1 March 1950 for use by MSTS. During the rest of 1950 she made two voyages to the Far East, carrying U.S. troops to Japan and Korea. Between 1950 and 1955 General M. B. Stewart also sailed from Bremerhaven, Germany, to New York and Halifax, Nova Scotia, transporting thousands of European refugees to the United States and Canada under the International Refugee Organization. In 1953 she made another voyage to Korea and transported home veteran troops before returning to her regular Bremerhaven-New York schedule. She maintained this pattern until being placed in Reduced Operational Status at New York 29 April 1955. She was finally transferred back to the Maritime Administration 21 May 1958 and was placed in the National Defense Reserve Fleet, Hudson River, New York where she remained until 1967.

At that time, she was sold to Albany River Transport Inc. of New York and rebuilt as a cargo ship by Todd Shipyard in Brooklyn. Renamed SS Albany when she entered commercial service in December 1968, the 10,530 gross ton cargo ship was sold to Avondale Shipyards, Inc. who converted her into Drill Ship Mission Viking for Mission Drilling & Exploration Corporation (later Mission Viking, Inc.) of New Orleans.

In 1978, Mission Viking was central to a dispute between Mission Viking, Inc. and the Occupational Safety and Health Administration (OSHA). OSHA inspectors cited two workers aboard the vessel while it was docked at Bender Shipbuilding and Repair Co., Inc. in Mobile, Alabama. Because of the nature of the work involved on the vessel, OSHA believed it had the authority to enforce its regulations aboard the barge. The owners, however, insisted that because the vessel was licensed with the Coast Guard and the work performed was done by crew members, that the Coast Guard, and not OSHA, had authority over the vessel's operations. In an appeal heard in 1981, OSHA's view prevailed.

In 1981 Mission Viking was transferred to Manufacturers Hanover Leasing Corp. of Panama. The ship was scrapped in July 1987.

General M. B. Stewart received one battle star for Korean War service.
