= Johnson School (North Adams, Massachusetts) =

- U.S. National Register of Historic Places
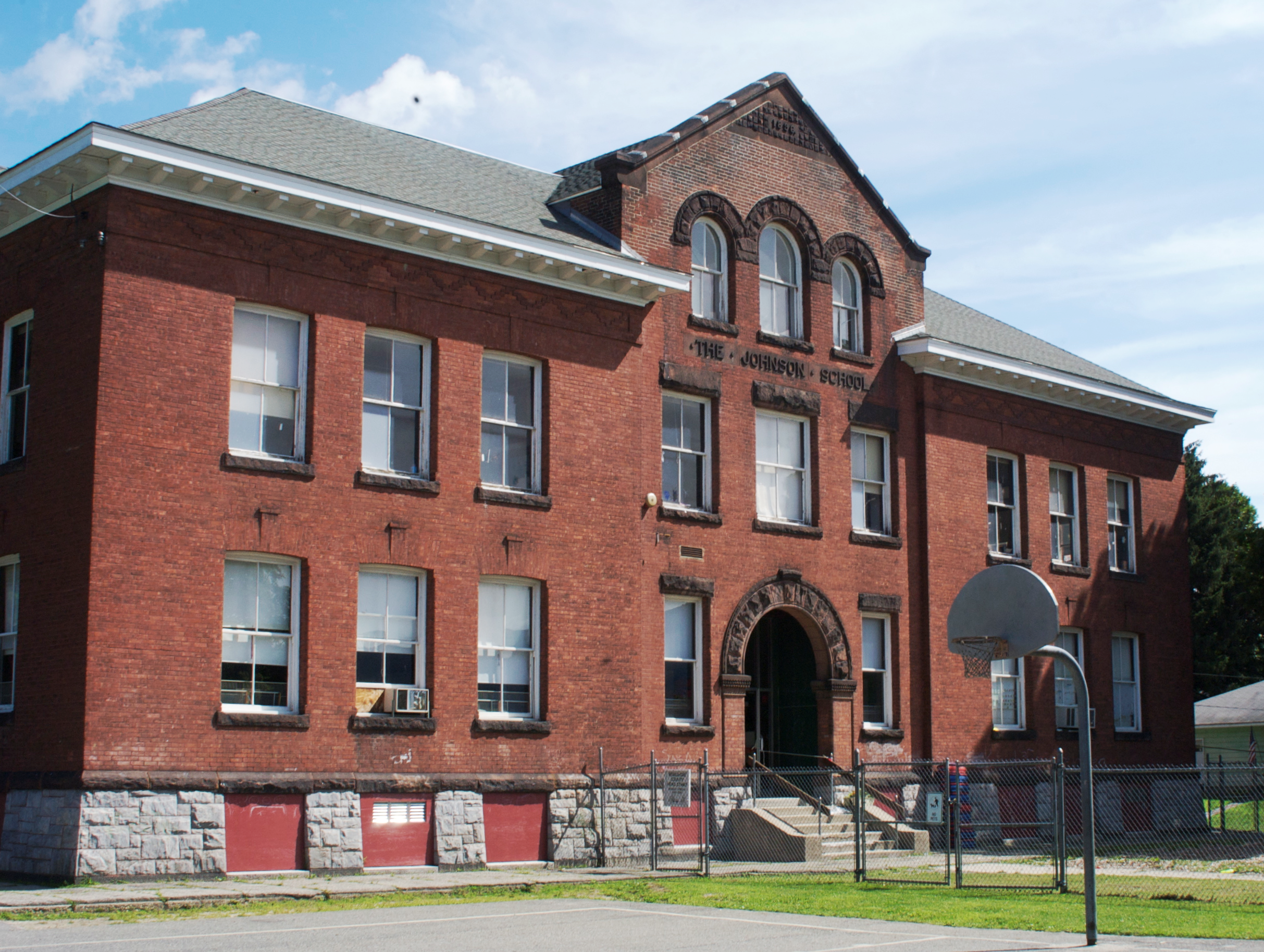
- (2009)

- Location within Massachusetts Location within the United States
- Location: North Adams, Massachusetts
- Coordinates: 42°42′18″N 73°7′8″W
- Built: 1896
- Architect: Edwin Thayer Barlow
- Architectural style: Romanesque Revival style
- MPS: North Adams MRA
- NRHP reference No.: 85003416
- Added to NRHP: October 25, 1985

The Johnson School is a historic former school building on School Street in North Adams, Massachusetts. Built about 1898, this Romanesque Revival school is a significant work of the prominent local architect Edwin Thayer Barlow. It was the last of the city's neighborhood schools to be closed. The building was added to the National Register of Historic Places in 1985. It is now used for Head Start and other social programs.

== Description and history ==
The Johnson School is located on the north side of School Street, occupying the entire block between Williams and Cady Streets in the city's Amity Square neighborhood. It is a two-story brick building, with a hip roof and granite foundation, with red sandstone trim elements. The roof is pierced on three sides by gabled center sections, that on the southern side, over the main entrance, more prominent than the others. The main facade is nine bays wide, the central three (below the gable) slightly recessed. Windows in the outer bays are set in segmented-arch openings, with sandstone sills and brick lintels with slightly projecting keystones. Windows in the central section are set in square openings with stone lintels and sills, except in the gable, where there are three windows set in round-arch openings. The main entrance is recessed in a round-arch opening with brick pilasters at the corners. The interior of the school retains significant original finishes.

The school was built in 1896 to a design by Edwin Thayer Barlow, a prominent local architect, at a time when the surrounding neighborhood was experiencing significant growth. In 1924 the school was enlarged, to a sympathetic design by Springfield architect Newton Bond. The school was one of the last neighborhood school in North Adams to be closed, and is now used for Head Start and other social programs.

== See also ==
- National Register of Historic Places listings in Berkshire County, Massachusetts
