= 1903–04 Brown men's ice hockey season =

- Conference: 5th IHA

Record
- Overall: 1–4–0
- Conference: 0–4–0
- Road: 1–2–0
- Neutral: 0–2–0

Coaches and captains
- Captain: Stephen Hunt

The 1903–04 Brown men's ice hockey season was the 7th season of play for the program.

== Season ==
After two seasons of diminishing returns, Brown continued to find ways to get worse. While their record was approximate to the year before, the Brunos didn't score a single goal against a collegiate opponent.

== Roster ==
No.	Nat.	Player	Class	Pos	Height	Weight	DoB	Hometown	Previous team
		Peter Chase	Sophomore
		Frederic Cook	Junior
		Prescott Hill	Sophomore	G
		Stephen Hunt (C)	Senior
		Charles Jones Jr.	Freshman	F
		Frederick Lane	Freshman
		Stephen Lowe	Junior
		Frank Marble	Junior
		Robert Marble	Junior
		Steven Mason	Senior
	(United States)	Horatio Otis	Senior	F			1883-11-29	Providence, Rhode Island
		Harold Paine	Freshman

== Standings ==
1903–04 Collegiate ice hockey standings
	Intercollegiate							Overall					
	GP	W	L	T	PCT.	GF	GA	GP	W	L	T	GF	GA
Army	0	0	0	0	–	0	0	6	5	1	0	39	9
Brown	4	0	4	0	.000	0	21	5	1	4	0	2	22
City College of New York	–	–	–	–	–	–	–	–	–	–	–	–	–
Columbia	6	4	2	0	.667	19	8	12	5	6	1	30	32
Cornell	1	0	1	0	.000	0	2	1	0	1	0	0	2
Harvard	5	5	0	0	1.000	27	5	6	6	0	0	31	6
Princeton	6	2	3	1	.417	10	12	12	6	5	1	28	25
Rensselaer	1	1	0	0	1.000	6	2	1	1	0	0	6	2
Union	–	–	–	–	–	–	–	4	2	2	0	–	–
Williams	0	0	0	0	–	0	0	4	2	2	0	11	13
Yale	8	4	3	1	.563	29	19	10	4	4	2	36	32

1903–04 Intercollegiate Hockey Association standings
	Conference								Overall					
	GP	W	L	T	PTS	GF	GA		GP	W	L	T	GF	GA
Harvard *	4	4	0	0	8	14	2	†	6	6	0	0	31	6
Yale	4	3	1	0	6	21	10		10	4	4	2	36	32
Columbia	4	2	2	0	4	9	8		12	5	6	1	30	32
Princeton	4	1	3	0	2	5	7	†	12	6	5	1	28	25
Brown	4	0	4	0	0	0	21		5	1	4	0	2	22
* indicates conference champion † The game between Princeton and Harvard was cancelled due to Princeton's inability to participate. As a result the Tigers were credited with a forfeit for the Intercollegiate Hockey Association standings.

== Schedule and results ==
Date	Opponent	Site	Result	Record
Regular Season
January 9	vs. Princeton	St. Nicholas Rink • New York, New York	L 0–1	0–1–0 (0–1–0)
January 20	at Phillips Academy*	Andover, Massachusetts	W 2–1	1–1–0
January 27	vs. Yale	St. Nicholas Rink • New York, New York	L 0–10	1–2–0 (0–2–0)
February 3	at Harvard	Holmes Field • Cambridge, Massachusetts	L 0–7	1–3–0 (0–3–0)
February 6	at Columbia	St. Nicholas Rink • New York, New York	L 0–3	1–4–0 (0–4–0)
*Non-conference game.
