= The Boardman =

- U.S. National Register of Historic Places
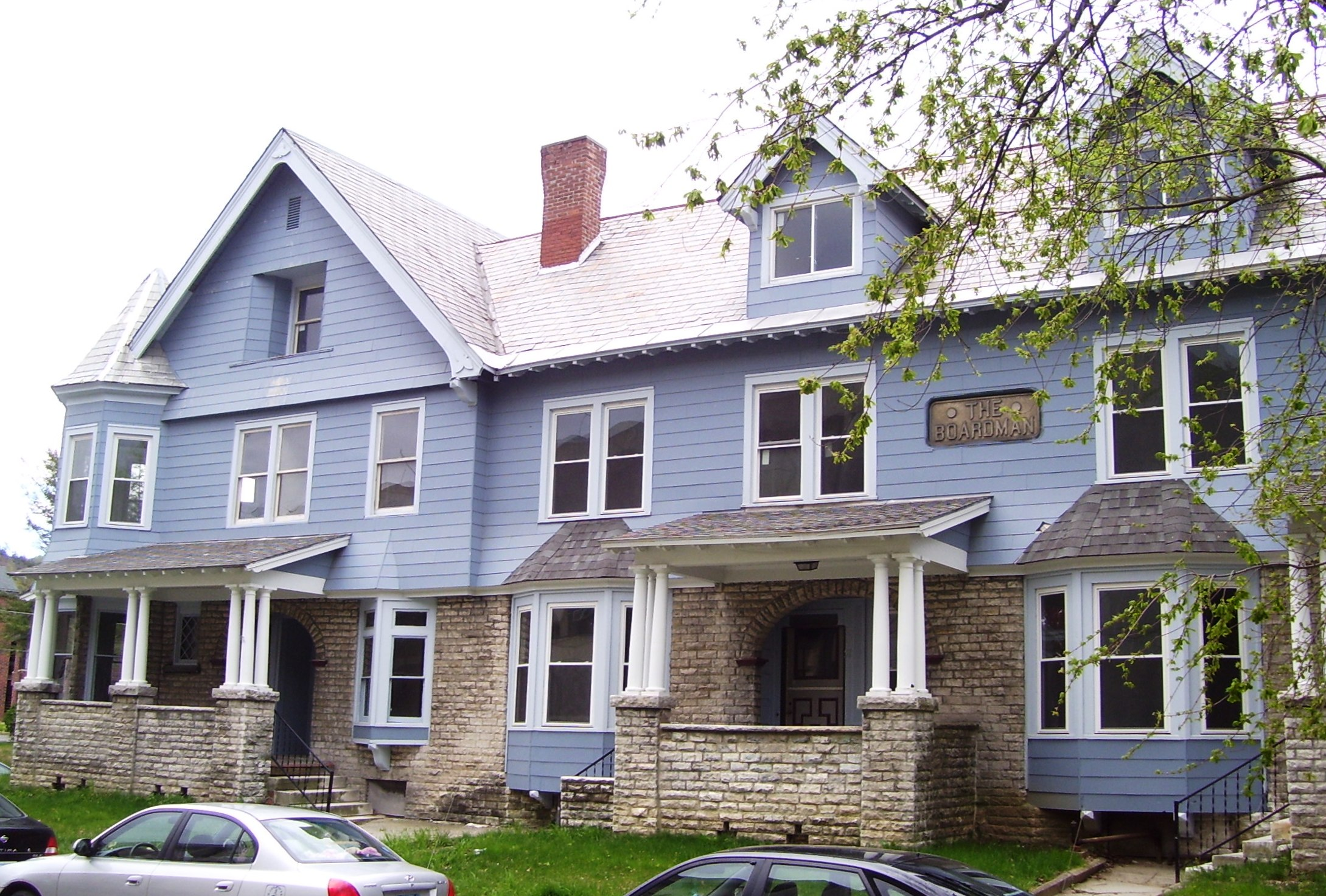
- (2012)

- Location within Massachusetts Location within the United States
- Location: 39-53 Montana St. North Adams, Massachusetts
- Coordinates: 42°41′32″N 73°6′20″W
- Built: 1899
- Architect: Edwin Thayer Barlow
- Architectural style: Colonial Revival
- MPS: North Adams MRA
- NRHP reference No.: 85003403
- Added to NRHP: October 25, 1985

The Boardman is a series of rowhouses at 39-53 Montana Street, occupying an entire city block between Hoosac and Blackinton Streets in North Adams, Massachusetts. The building was, at the time of its construction (1899–1901), one of the most elaborate multiunit buildings in the city, and were added to the National Register of Historic Places in 1985.

== Description and history ==
The Boardman is located southeast of downtown North Adams, on the west side of Montana Street, occupying the full block between Blackinton Street and Hoosac Street. It is a 2-1/2 story rowhouse consisting of nine units, set townhouse style in a single structure. The first floor was built of stone, while the second floor is of wood frame construction originally covered in wooden clapboards. Each unit featured porches in front and in back, and has what was originally considered a servant staircase in the rear, an indication of the status of the intended occupants. The servants' quarters were located in the attic level. The typical unit has a two-part facade, with a porch on one side and a bay window adjacent. The porches are shed-roofed, with a rounded arch housing the entrance and a flanking sash window. The porches are supported by clustered round columns, set on raised brick piers, with a brick connecting parapet in between.

The Boardman was built by developer Walter Penniman in two stages on land subdivided from the estate of F. R. Blackinton in response to the demand for housing occasioned by the establishment of the normal school (now the Massachusetts College of Liberal Arts, located across the street). The first four units were built in 1899, the other five in 1901. The architect was Edwin Thayer Barlow, who designed the row in Colonial Revival style. The Pennimans were briefly resident here, and its early tenants included teachers, a chemist, and the principal editor of the North Adams Transcript.

== See also ==
- National Register of Historic Places listings in Berkshire County, Massachusetts
