= 1903–04 Yale Bulldogs men's ice hockey season =

College ice hockey season

- Conference: 2nd IHA

Record
- Overall: 4–4–2
- Conference: 4–3–0
- Road: 1–1–1
- Neutral: 3–3–1

Coaches and captains
- Captain: G. B. Ward

The 1903–04 Yale Bulldogs men's ice hockey season was the ninth season of play for the program.

== Season ==
Due to poor ice conditions, Yale played only a single game at home.

The team did not have a coach, however, George Mohlman served as team manager.

== Roster ==
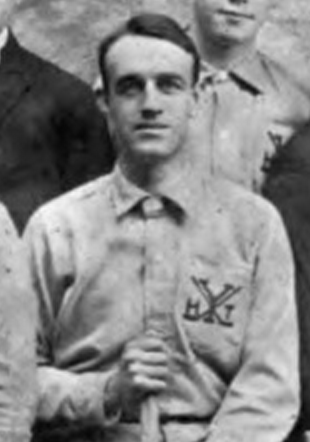
G. B. Ward from the 1904 Yale yearbook

No.	Nat.	Player	Class	Pos	Height	Weight	DoB	Hometown	Previous team
		Frank M. Adams	Graduate
	(United States)	Karl Behr	Sophomore	F			1885-05-30	New York, New York
		Johnny Cornell	Sophomore	F
		John Dilworth	Sophomore	F
		A. Rex Flinn	Sophomore	D
		Frederic Kay	Junior
		Bill Marcus	Sophomore	F
		William Miller
		Ralph Peverley	Sophomore	G
		Rufus Rowland	Sophomore	F
	(United States)	G. B. Ward (C)	Graduate	D			1878-11-06	Bristol, Connecticut

== Standings ==
1903–04 Collegiate ice hockey standings
	Intercollegiate							Overall					
	GP	W	L	T	PCT.	GF	GA	GP	W	L	T	GF	GA
Army	0	0	0	0	–	0	0	6	5	1	0	39	9
Brown	4	0	4	0	.000	0	21	5	1	4	0	2	22
City College of New York	–	–	–	–	–	–	–	–	–	–	–	–	–
Columbia	6	4	2	0	.667	19	8	12	5	6	1	30	32
Cornell	1	0	1	0	.000	0	2	1	0	1	0	0	2
Harvard	5	5	0	0	1.000	27	5	6	6	0	0	31	6
Princeton	6	2	3	1	.417	10	12	12	6	5	1	28	25
Rensselaer	1	1	0	0	1.000	6	2	1	1	0	0	6	2
Union	–	–	–	–	–	–	–	4	2	2	0	–	–
Williams	0	0	0	0	–	0	0	4	2	2	0	11	13
Yale	8	4	3	1	.563	29	19	10	4	4	2	36	32

1903–04 Intercollegiate Hockey Association standings
	Conference								Overall					
	GP	W	L	T	PTS	GF	GA		GP	W	L	T	GF	GA
Harvard *	4	4	0	0	8	14	2	†	6	6	0	0	31	6
Yale	4	3	1	0	6	21	10		10	4	4	2	36	32
Columbia	4	2	2	0	4	9	8		12	5	6	1	30	32
Princeton	4	1	3	0	2	5	7	†	12	6	5	1	28	25
Brown	4	0	4	0	0	0	21		5	1	4	0	2	22
* indicates conference champion † The game between Princeton and Harvard was cancelled due to Princeton's inability to participate. As a result the Tigers were credited with a forfeit for the Intercollegiate Hockey Association standings.

== Schedule and results ==
Date	Opponent	Site	Result	Record
Regular season
December 16	at New York Hockey Club*	St. Nicholas Rink • New York, New York	T 3–3 ^{OT}	0–0–1
December 29	vs. Princeton*	Duquesne Garden • Pittsburgh, Pennsylvania	T 2–2 ^{OT}	0–0–2
December 30	vs. Princeton*	Duquesne Garden • Pittsburgh, Pennsylvania	W 2–1	1–0–2
December 31	vs. Princeton*	Duquesne Garden • Pittsburgh, Pennsylvania	L 1–2	1–1–2
January 1	at Pittsburgh Athletic Club*	Duquesne Garden • Pittsburgh, Pennsylvania	L 4–10	1–2–2
January 6	at Yale Alumni*	New Haven, Connecticut (Exhibition)	L 2–4	
January 16	at Columbia	St. Nicholas Rink • New York, New York	W 5–2	2–2–2 (1–0–0)
January 27	vs. Brown	St. Nicholas Rink • New York, New York	W 10–0	3–2–2 (2–0–0)
February 15	vs. Princeton	St. Nicholas Rink • New York, New York	W 4–3 ^{OT}	4–2–2 (3–0–0)
February 22	vs. Harvard	St. Nicholas Rink • New York, New York (Rivalry)	L 2–5	4–3–2 (3–1–0)
February 27	vs. Harvard*	St. Nicholas Rink • New York, New York (IHA Championship, Rivalry)	L 3–4 ^{3OT}	4–4–2
*Non-conference game.
