= Blair Building =

Former skyscraper in Manhattan, New York

Coordinates: 40.7065°N 74.0111°W

- The Blair Building in 1932
- Interactive map of the Blair Building area
- Alternative names: Blair and Company Building

General information
- Status: Demolished
- Architectural style: Neoclassical architecture
- Location: 24 Broad Street, Manhattan, New York City, U.S.
- Construction started: 1902
- Construction stopped: 1903
- Opened: 1903
- Demolished: 1955

Design and construction
- Architect: Carrère and Hastings

The Blair Building, also known as the Blair and Company Building, was an early skyscraper in Lower Manhattan, New York City.

== History ==
It was constructed in 1902–1903. It was located at 24 Broad Street in the Financial District of Manhattan, New York City, and had a white marble facade. It was built by Andrew J. Robinson Company. The Architectural Record ran an article about it in 1903 titled "A Beaux-Arts Skyscraper". It was demolished in 1955.

It was designed by Carrere and Hastings and Edwin Thayer Barlow of the firm was the supervising architect for construction. Henry W. Post was the building's structural engineer. He also worked on the Gillender Building.

In 1928 the building was purchased to be part of the expanding New York Stock Exchange Building complex. Irving Underhill photographed the building in 1932.

It was next to the adjoining Commercial Cable Building built in 1897 at 20 Broad Street.

== See also ==
- John Insley Blair
- DeWitt Clinton Blair
- C. Ledyard Blair
