= 1903–04 Army Cadets men's ice hockey season =

Sports season

- Conference: Independent
- Home ice: Lusk Reservoir

Record
- Overall: 5–1–0

Coaches and captains
- Head coach: Edward Leonard King
- Captain: LeRoy Bartlett

The 1903–04 Army Cadets men's ice hockey season was the inaugural season of play for the program.

== Season ==
Army began their program in the spring semester of the 1903–04 school term. Captain Edward Leonard King, the head coach of the football team, agreed to coach the ice hockey team as well. The team began its oldest rivalry against the Royal Military College of Canada (then called Kingston Military Academy), winning the first meeting 11–0.

== Roster ==
No.	Nat.	Player	Class	Pos	Height	Weight	DoB	Hometown	Previous team
		LeRoy Bartlett (C)					1880-12-17

== Standings ==
1903–04 Collegiate ice hockey standings
	Intercollegiate							Overall					
	GP	W	L	T	PCT.	GF	GA	GP	W	L	T	GF	GA
Army	0	0	0	0	–	0	0	6	5	1	0	39	9
Brown	4	0	4	0	.000	0	21	5	1	4	0	2	22
City College of New York	–	–	–	–	–	–	–	–	–	–	–	–	–
Columbia	6	4	2	0	.667	19	8	12	5	6	1	30	32
Cornell	1	0	1	0	.000	0	2	1	0	1	0	0	2
Harvard	5	5	0	0	1.000	27	5	6	6	0	0	31	6
Princeton	6	2	3	1	.417	10	12	12	6	5	1	28	25
Rensselaer	1	1	0	0	1.000	6	2	1	1	0	0	6	2
Union	–	–	–	–	–	–	–	4	2	2	0	–	–
Williams	0	0	0	0	–	0	0	4	2	2	0	11	13
Yale	8	4	3	1	.563	29	19	10	4	4	2	36	32

== Schedule and results ==
Date	Opponent	Site	Result	Record
Regular Season
	Newburgh Free Academy*	Lusk Reservoir • West Point, New York	W 7–1	1–0–0
	Mohegan Lake School*	Lusk Reservoir • West Point, New York	L 1–4	1–1–0
	Newburgh Alumni*	Lusk Reservoir • West Point, New York	W 4–3	2–1–0
	Holbrook*	Lusk Reservoir • West Point, New York	W 8–0	3–1–0
	Kingston Military Academy*	Lusk Reservoir • West Point, New York	W 11–0	4–1–0
	Riverview Athletic Club*	Lusk Reservoir • West Point, New York	W 8–1	5–1–0
*Non-conference game.
