= East River Savings Bank =

East River Savings Bank may refer to:

- 291 Broadway, Manhattan
- 26 Cortlandt Street, Manhattan; see Cortlandt Street (Manhattan)#Buildings
- 743 Amsterdam Avenue at West 96th Street, the bank's first branch
