= 1903–04 Columbia men's ice hockey season =

- Conference: 3rd IHA
- Home ice: St. Nicholas Rink

Record
- Overall: 5–6–1
- Conference: 2–2–0
- Home: 3–2–0
- Road: 0–1–0
- Neutral: 2–3–1

Coaches and captains
- Captain: Albert Akin

The 1903–04 Columbia men's ice hockey season was the 8th season of play for the program.

== Season ==
The team did not have a head coach but E. H. Updike served as team manager.

Note: Columbia University adopted the Lion as its mascot in 1910.

== Roster ==
No.	Nat.	Player	Class	Pos	Height	Weight	DoB	Hometown	Previous team
		Albert J. Akin (C)	Senior	F
		Farrand Benedict	Senior	D
		William Bode	Junior
		Thomas Brady Jr.	Sophomore
		William Callaghan	Graduate	F
		Walter Cook Jr.	Junior	F
		William Duden	Graduate	F
		Charles Jackson	Freshman	D
		Douglas McKee	Junior
	(United States)	Rudolph L. von Bernuth	Senior	G			1883-12-18	New York, New York

== Standings ==
1903–04 Collegiate ice hockey standings
	Intercollegiate							Overall					
	GP	W	L	T	PCT.	GF	GA	GP	W	L	T	GF	GA
Army	0	0	0	0	–	0	0	6	5	1	0	39	9
Brown	4	0	4	0	.000	0	21	5	1	4	0	2	22
City College of New York	–	–	–	–	–	–	–	–	–	–	–	–	–
Columbia	6	4	2	0	.667	19	8	12	5	6	1	30	32
Cornell	1	0	1	0	.000	0	2	1	0	1	0	0	2
Harvard	5	5	0	0	1.000	27	5	6	6	0	0	31	6
Princeton	6	2	3	1	.417	10	12	12	6	5	1	28	25
Rensselaer	1	1	0	0	1.000	6	2	1	1	0	0	6	2
Union	–	–	–	–	–	–	–	4	2	2	0	–	–
Williams	0	0	0	0	–	0	0	4	2	2	0	11	13
Yale	8	4	3	1	.563	29	19	10	4	4	2	36	32

1903–04 Intercollegiate Hockey Association standings
	Conference								Overall					
	GP	W	L	T	PTS	GF	GA		GP	W	L	T	GF	GA
Harvard *	4	4	0	0	8	14	2	†	6	6	0	0	31	6
Yale	4	3	1	0	6	21	10		10	4	4	2	36	32
Columbia	4	2	2	0	4	9	8		12	5	6	1	30	32
Princeton	4	1	3	0	2	5	7	†	12	6	5	1	28	25
Brown	4	0	4	0	0	0	21		5	1	4	0	2	22
* indicates conference champion † The game between Princeton and Harvard was cancelled due to Princeton's inability to participate. As a result the Tigers were credited with a forfeit for the Intercollegiate Hockey Association standings.

== Schedule and results ==
Date	Opponent	Site	Result	Record
Regular Season
	vs. New York Athletic Club*	St. Nicholas Rink • New York, New York	L 4–6	0–1–0
	vs. City College of New York*	St. Nicholas Rink • New York, New York	W 8–0	1–1–0
	vs. Naval Reserves*	St. Nicholas Rink • New York, New York	W 4–3	2–1–0
January 8	Brooklyn Crescents*	Clermont Avenue Skating Rink • Brooklyn, New York	L 0–7	2–2–0
January 12	vs. New York Athletic Club*	St. Nicholas Rink • New York, New York	T 1–1	2–2–1
January 16	Yale	St. Nicholas Rink • New York, New York	L 3–5 †	2–3–1 (0–1–0)
January 23	vs. New York Wanderers*	St. Nicholas Rink • New York, New York	L 0–3	2–4–1
January 30	Harvard	St. Nicholas Rink • New York, New York	L 0–2	2–5–1 (0–2–0)
February 6	Brown	St. Nicholas Rink • New York, New York	W 3–0	3–5–1 (1–2–0)
February 17	Princeton	St. Nicholas Rink • New York, New York	W 3–1	4–5–1 (2–2–0)
February 22	Cornell*	St. Nicholas Rink • New York, New York	W 2–0 ‡	5–5–1
February 24	vs. New York Wanderers*	St. Nicholas Rink • New York, New York	L 2–4	5–6–1
*Non-conference game.

† Yale records the score of the game as 5–2.
‡ Cornell records the score of the game as 2–1.
