= 1903–04 Princeton Tigers men's ice hockey season =

College ice hockey season

- Conference: 4th IHA

Record
- Overall: 6–5–1
- Conference: 1–3–0
- Road: 3–3–0
- Neutral: 3–2–1

Coaches and captains
- Captain: Lyttleton Purnell

The 1903–04 Princeton Tigers men's ice hockey season was the 5th season of play for the program.

== Season ==
The Tigers' season was highlighted by a three-game set against Yale in Pittsburgh where Princeton came away with an even split. Princeton was forced to forfeit the game against Harvard on January 23 due to the Tigers being unable to participate.

== Roster ==
No.	Nat.	Player	Class	Pos	Height	Weight	DoB	Hometown	Previous team
		Alfred King	Junior	D
		Philip Chew	Freshman	F
		John Chislett	Freshman	G
		Thomas Dallmeyer	Freshman	F
		Joseph Kafer	Junior	F
		Robert Leake	Senior	F
		Chester Levis	Freshman	F
	(United States)	Lyttleton Purnell (C)	Senior	F			1880-11-15	Baltimore, Maryland
		William Sayen	Junior	D
		Afton Zahniser	Freshman	D

== Standings ==
1903–04 Collegiate ice hockey standings
	Intercollegiate							Overall					
	GP	W	L	T	PCT.	GF	GA	GP	W	L	T	GF	GA
Army	0	0	0	0	–	0	0	6	5	1	0	39	9
Brown	4	0	4	0	.000	0	21	5	1	4	0	2	22
City College of New York	–	–	–	–	–	–	–	–	–	–	–	–	–
Columbia	6	4	2	0	.667	19	8	12	5	6	1	30	32
Cornell	1	0	1	0	.000	0	2	1	0	1	0	0	2
Harvard	5	5	0	0	1.000	27	5	6	6	0	0	31	6
Princeton	6	2	3	1	.417	10	12	12	6	5	1	28	25
Rensselaer	1	1	0	0	1.000	6	2	1	1	0	0	6	2
Union	–	–	–	–	–	–	–	4	2	2	0	–	–
Williams	0	0	0	0	–	0	0	4	2	2	0	11	13
Yale	8	4	3	1	.563	29	19	10	4	4	2	36	32

1903–04 Intercollegiate Hockey Association standings
	Conference								Overall					
	GP	W	L	T	PTS	GF	GA		GP	W	L	T	GF	GA
Harvard *	4	4	0	0	8	14	2	†	6	6	0	0	31	6
Yale	4	3	1	0	6	21	10		10	4	4	2	36	32
Columbia	4	2	2	0	4	9	8		12	5	6	1	30	32
Princeton	4	1	3	0	2	5	7	†	12	6	5	1	28	25
Brown	4	0	4	0	0	0	21		5	1	4	0	2	22
* indicates conference champion † The game between Princeton and Harvard was cancelled due to Princeton's inability to participate. As a result the Tigers were credited with a forfeit for the Intercollegiate Hockey Association standings.

== Schedule and results ==
Date	Opponent	Site	Result	Record
Regular Season
December 12	at New York Athletic Club*	St. Nicholas Rink • New York, New York	L 1–2	0–1–0
December 15	at Lawrenceville School*	Lawrenceville, New Jersey	W 1–0	1–1–0
December 26	at Pittsburgh Athletic Club*	Duquesne Garden • Pittsburgh, Pennsylvania	L 3–6	1–2–0
December 28	at Pittsburgh All-Scholastic Team*	Duquesne Garden • Pittsburgh, Pennsylvania	W 3–1	2–2–0
December 29	vs. Yale*	Duquesne Garden • Pittsburgh, Pennsylvania	T 2–2 ^{OT}	2–2–1
December 30	vs. Yale*	Duquesne Garden • Pittsburgh, Pennsylvania	L 1–2	2–3–1
December 31	vs. Yale*	Duquesne Garden • Pittsburgh, Pennsylvania	W 2–1	3–3–1
January 9	vs. Brown	St. Nicholas Rink • New York, New York	W 1–0	4–3–1 (1–0–0)
February 11	at Albany High School*	Albany, New York	W 6–2	5–3–1
February 12	vs. All-Collegiate Team*	Albany, New York	W 4–2 ^{OT}	6–3–1
February 13	vs. Yale	St. Nicholas Rink • New York, New York	L 3–4 ^{OT}	6–4–1 (1–1–0)
February 17	at Columbia	St. Nicholas Rink • New York, New York	L 1–3	6–5–1 (1–2–0)
*Non-conference game.
