= 1903–04 Cornell men's ice hockey season =

Record
- Overall: 0–1–0
- Conference: 0–1–0
- Road: 0–1–0

Coaches and captains
- Captain: Albert Ellis

The 1903–04 Cornell men's ice hockey season was the 5th season of play for the program.

== Season ==
After playing a single game during the year, Cornell mothballed its ice hockey program until it could produce an ice rink closer to its Ithaca, New York campus. The program would remain shuttered for two years.

Note: Cornell University did not formally adopt 'Big Red' as its moniker until after 1905. They have been, however, associated with 'Carnelian and White' since the school's Inauguration Day on October 7, 1868.

== Roster ==
No.	Nat.	Player	Class	Pos	Height	Weight	DoB	Hometown	Previous team
		Ervin Armstrong	Senior	F			1883-08-16
	(United States)	James Braman	Junior	F				Watervliet, New York
	(United States)	Carleton Dederer	Senior	D			1880-10-01	Jersey City, New Jersey
	(United States)	Albert Ellis (C)	Senior	D			1881-04-17	Pittsburgh, Pennsylvania
	(United States)	Edward Foote	Junior	F			1884-07-03	Greenwich, Connecticut
		Robert Lockerby	Sophomore	G
		Sylvester Preston	Junior	F			1883-10-25

== Standings ==
1903–04 Collegiate ice hockey standings
	Intercollegiate							Overall					
	GP	W	L	T	PCT.	GF	GA	GP	W	L	T	GF	GA
Army	0	0	0	0	–	0	0	6	5	1	0	39	9
Brown	4	0	4	0	.000	0	21	5	1	4	0	2	22
City College of New York	–	–	–	–	–	–	–	–	–	–	–	–	–
Columbia	6	4	2	0	.667	19	8	12	5	6	1	30	32
Cornell	1	0	1	0	.000	0	2	1	0	1	0	0	2
Harvard	5	5	0	0	1.000	27	5	6	6	0	0	31	6
Princeton	6	2	3	1	.417	10	12	12	6	5	1	28	25
Rensselaer	1	1	0	0	1.000	6	2	1	1	0	0	6	2
Union	–	–	–	–	–	–	–	4	2	2	0	–	–
Williams	0	0	0	0	–	0	0	4	2	2	0	11	13
Yale	8	4	3	1	.563	29	19	10	4	4	2	36	32

== Schedule and results ==
Date	Opponent	Site	Result	Record
Regular Season
February 22	at Columbia	St. Nicholas Rink • New York, New York	L 0–2	0–1–0 (0–1–0)
*Non-conference game.
