= Hillside Cemetery (North Adams, Massachusetts) =

Historic cemetery in Massachusetts, United States

- U.S. National Register of Historic Places
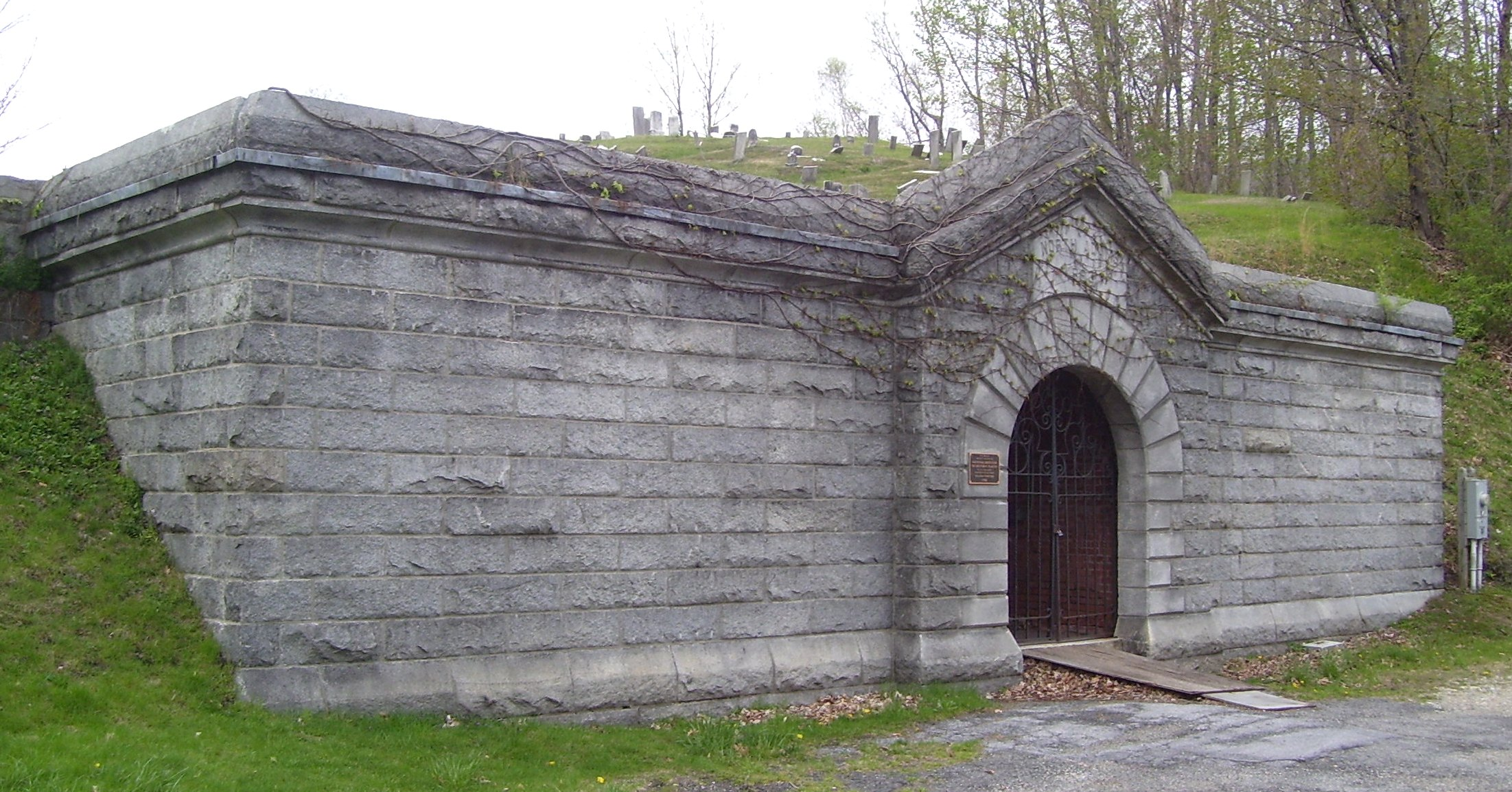
- Hillside Cemetery

- Location within Massachusetts Location within the United States
- Location: West Main St., North Adams, Massachusetts
- Coordinates: 42°42′1″N 73°7′24″W
- Area: 18 acres (7.3 ha)
- Built: 1798
- Architect: Col. F.W. Merriam
- MPS: North Adams MRA
- NRHP reference No.: 01000722
- Added to NRHP: July 19, 2001

Hillside Cemetery is a historic cemetery on West Main Street (Massachusetts Route 2) between Brown Street and Charles Street in North Adams, Massachusetts, United States. Located on the western fringe of the city, the earliest portions of the cemetery date to 1798; it is the community's oldest public burying ground. The cemetery is divided by Route 2, with the older section to the north and the younger section (laid out in 1858) to the south. The cemetery's location at the foot of Mount Greylock gives it excellent views of the surrounding area, and of the urban core of North Adams.

The older portion of the cemetery is less formally laid out than the newer section. It includes a fairly steeply sloped hill and a bowl-shaped valley, and is lined by grassy paths laid out in a grid. The oldest graves are at the top of the hill, the oldest dating to 1798. The southern portion of the cemetery is much larger, and is laid out with narrow roadways, most of which were in place by 1878. The terrain of the southern section is similar to that of the northern, also featuring a hill and valley. The most prominent memorial is the Tinker Mausoleum (1926), located in the northern section.

The oldest surviving cemetery in North Adams is the Old Congregational Burying Ground (1780). Hillside appears to have been established as a family cemetery of the locally prominent Knight family, who buried their daughter Olive in 1798. Members of the Knight family were among the first to introduce textile manufacturing into North Adams, its early source of growth and prosperity in the 19th century. The town of Adams (from which North Adams separated in 1878) purchased the southern tract in 1858. North Adams' second public cemetery, located in the southern part of the city, was opened in 1898.

The cemetery was listed on the National Register of Historic Places in 2001.

== Notable burials ==
- Edwin Thayer Barlow, architect
- Grant Tinker, American television executive

== See also ==
- National Register of Historic Places listings in Berkshire County, Massachusetts
