= 1903–04 Harvard Crimson men's ice hockey season =

College ice hockey season

Intercollegiate Champion Intercollegiate Hockey Association, Champion
- Conference: 1st IHA

Record
- Overall: 6–0–0
- Conference: 4–0–0
- Home: 3–0–0
- Road: 1–0–0
- Neutral: 2–0–0

Coaches and captains
- Head coach: Alfred Winsor
- Captain: Tristam Souther

The 1903–04 Harvard Crimson men's ice hockey season was the seventh season of play for the program.

== Season ==
A year after graduating, Alfred Winsor returned to Harvard as the program's first full-time head coach. Windsor's return didn't change anything for the Crimson as they again won all of their games and claimed their second consecutive Intercollegiate championship. Princeton was forced to forfeit the game against Harvard on January 23 due to the Tigers being unable to participate. This game was only counted as a forfeit for the Intercollegiate Hockey Association standings.

== Roster ==
No.	Nat.	Player	Class	Pos	Height	Weight	DoB	Hometown	Previous team
	(United States)	Trowbridge Callaway	Junior	F			1882-12-03	Chicago, Illinois
	(United States)	Proctor Carr	Senior	D				Andover, New Hampshire
	(United States)	William Clothier	Senior	D			1881-09-27	Sharon Hill, Pennsylvania
		Malcolm Ivy	Senior	G
		Eldon MacLeod	Sophomore	F			1883-03-18
	(United States)	Daniel Newhall	Sophomore	F			1884-12-03	Philadelphia, Pennsylvania
		Rusell Sard	Junior	D
	(United States)	Tristam Souther (C)	Senior	F			1881-11-11	New York, New York
	(United States)	Richard Townsend	Freshman	F			1885-07-27	Roxbury, Massachusetts
		Enos Wilder	Sophomore	F

== Standings ==
1903–04 Collegiate ice hockey standings
	Intercollegiate							Overall					
	GP	W	L	T	PCT.	GF	GA	GP	W	L	T	GF	GA
Army	0	0	0	0	–	0	0	6	5	1	0	39	9
Brown	4	0	4	0	.000	0	21	5	1	4	0	2	22
City College of New York	–	–	–	–	–	–	–	–	–	–	–	–	–
Columbia	6	4	2	0	.667	19	8	12	5	6	1	30	32
Cornell	1	0	1	0	.000	0	2	1	0	1	0	0	2
Harvard	5	5	0	0	1.000	27	5	6	6	0	0	31	6
Princeton	6	2	3	1	.417	10	12	12	6	5	1	28	25
Rensselaer	1	1	0	0	1.000	6	2	1	1	0	0	6	2
Union	–	–	–	–	–	–	–	4	2	2	0	–	–
Williams	0	0	0	0	–	0	0	4	2	2	0	11	13
Yale	8	4	3	1	.563	29	19	10	4	4	2	36	32

1903–04 Intercollegiate Hockey Association standings
	Conference								Overall					
	GP	W	L	T	PTS	GF	GA		GP	W	L	T	GF	GA
Harvard *	4	4	0	0	8	14	2	†	6	6	0	0	31	6
Yale	4	3	1	0	6	21	10		10	4	4	2	36	32
Columbia	4	2	2	0	4	9	8		12	5	6	1	30	32
Princeton	4	1	3	0	2	5	7	†	12	6	5	1	28	25
Brown	4	0	4	0	0	0	21		5	1	4	0	2	22
* indicates conference champion † The game between Princeton and Harvard was cancelled due to Princeton's inability to participate. As a result the Tigers were credited with a forfeit for the Intercollegiate Hockey Association standings.

== Schedule and results ==
Date	Opponent	Site	Result	Record
Regular Season
December 19	Boston Hockey Club*	Holmes Field • Boston, Massachusetts	W 4–1	1–0–0
January 30	at Columbia	St. Nicholas Rink • New York, New York	W 2–0	2–0–0 (1–0–0)
February 3	vs. Brown	Holmes Field • Boston, Massachusetts	W 7–0	3–0–0 (2–0–0)
February 6	Springfield Training	Holmes Field • Boston, Massachusetts	W 9–0	4–0–0
February 22	vs. Yale	St. Nicholas Rink • New York, New York (Rivalry)	W 5–2	5–0–0 (3–0–0)
February 27	vs. Yale*	St. Nicholas Rink • New York, New York (IHA Championship, Rivalry)	W 4–3 ^{3OT}	6–0–0
*Non-conference game.

== Scoring Statistics ==
Name	Position	Games	Goals
Tristam Souther	F	6	10
Enos Wilder	F	6	7
Richard Townsend	F	5	4
Hugh Kernan	F	2	3
Eldon MacLeod	F	3	2
Daniel Newhall	F	5	2
William Clothier	D	6	2
Trowbridge Callaway	F	2	1
Russell Sard	D	1	0
Morris	D	1	0
Proctor Carr	D	5	0
Malcolm Ivy	G	6	0
Total			31

Note: Assists were not recorded as a statistic.
