= Merch Bradt Stewart =

United States Army general

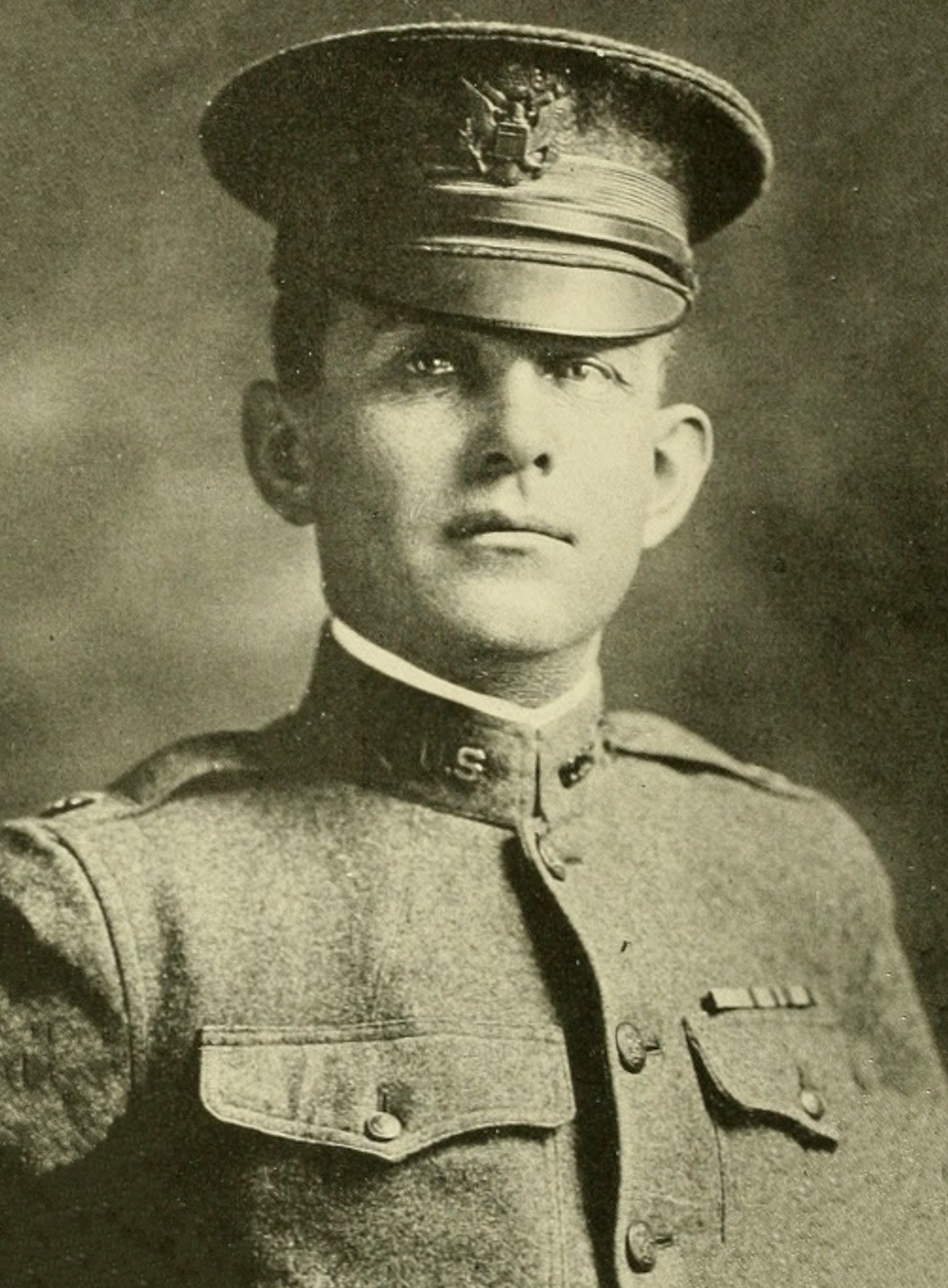
- Stewart as commander of 175th Brigade, 88th Division in World War I
- Born: June 24, 1875; Mitchells, Virginia, US
- Died: July 3, 1934 (aged 59); St. Augustine, Florida, US
- Burial place: West Point Cemetery, West Point, New York
- Military career
- Allegiance: United States
- Branch: United States Army
- Service years: 1896–1927
- Rank: Major General
- Nickname: M.B. Stewart
- Service number: 0-515
- Commands: Superintendent of the United States Military Academy
- Conflicts: Spanish–American War; World War I
- Awards: Army Distinguished Service Medal; Legion of Honor; Croix de Guerre

Merch Bradt Stewart (June 24, 1875 – July 3, 1934), often called M. B. Stewart was a writer, educator, and career United States Army officer who became superintendent of the United States Military Academy. Stewart authored several U.S. Army manuals, penned a popular narrative of his considerable experiences as second lieutenant in the Spanish–American War, and in the years preceding World War I wrote essays informing the public on issues of physical and military education.

== Early life ==
Merch Stewart was born in Mitchells, Virginia, June 24, 1875. Appointed from New York to the United States Military Academy (USMA), he graduated in the bottom half of his cadet class of 1896. Among his classmates at the academy there were several men who would, like Stewart himself, eventually attain the rank of general officer, such as Edward L. King, Lucious R. Holbrook, Dennis E. Nolan, Frank C. Bolles, LeRoy Eltinge and George H. Shelton.

== Military career ==
After brief assignment to the 11th Infantry, Stewart was transferred to the 8th Infantry Regiment, served three years on the Platte River and was detailed to topographic service before the outbreak of the Spanish–American War. He was with his regiment in operations before Santiago, Cuba, including the Battle of El Caney and the Battle of San Juan Hill. After the surrender of Santiago, Stewart saw duty for a time as aide-de-camp to Major General William Ludlow. He received the Silver Star for heroism at El Caney.

Stewart was regimental commissary until his unit's deployment to the Philippine Islands in 1901, where he served first as quartermaster, then as garrison commander at Pagsanjan, Laguna. Promoted to captain in the 8th Infantry regiment, Stewart accompanied the regiment to stations at Fort Lawton, Washington and Governor's Island, New York, then spent a three-year tour teaching infantry tactics at the academy before returning to the Philippines with his regiment and then serving with the regiment at the Rock Island Arsenal.

He served in Washington, D.C. as a member of the Infantry Equipment Board in 1909 and 1910, and then as adjutant of the 8th Regiment in Monterey, California, Fort Leavenworth, and Fort Sam Houston until 1911. He was a member of Infantry Drill Regulation Board in early 1911, and then received promotion to major and assignment with the 5th Infantry Regiment in Puerto Rico until the end of 1912.

Stewart served with the 5th Infantry at Plattsburgh Barracks from 1912 to 1913. He organized and conducted the Massachusetts officer training school for volunteer reservists in 1913 and 1914, commanded a special experimental training company 1913 and 1914, and served with the 5th Infantry in the Panama Canal Zone from 1914 to 1916. He returned to Plattsburgh in 1916 to lead reserve officer training schools, and later that year received assignment as inspector general of the District of Columbia National Guard. In 1917, he again commanded officer training schools in Plattsburgh, and received temporary promotions to lieutenant colonel and colonel as the Army expanded for World War I.

In late 1917 and early 1918, he served briefly on the Army's general staff, and then received assignment as chief of staff for the 76th Division. After serving in France with the 76th Division, Stewart received promotion to temporary brigadier general and assignment as commander of 175th Brigade, 88th Division.

After the war, Stewart returned to the permanent rank of major and commanded an Overseas Replacement Depot at Fort Meade, Maryland, served again at Fort Leavenworth and on the Army General Staff, and received promotions to permanent lieutenant colonel and colonel. In 1923 Stewart was assigned as Commandant of Cadets at West Point. He served until retiring in 1927, and received promotion to permanent brigadier general in 1925, and major general at his retirement.

== Awards ==
He received the Army Distinguished Service Medal, French Croix de Guerre, and French Legion of Honor.

The citation for his Army DSM reads:

The President of the United States of America, authorized by Act of Congress, July 9, 1918, takes pleasure in presenting the Army Distinguished Service Medal to Brigadier General Merch Bradt Stewart, United States Army, for exceptionally meritorious and distinguished services to the Government of the United States, in a duty of great responsibility during World War I. As Senior Instructor at the Plattsburg Training Camp from May until August 1917, General Stewart displayed organizing and training ability and talents of the highest order, in successfully directing the training and selection of 6,000 officer candidates, thereby rendering services of inestimable value to our newly-formed forces. As Chief of Staff, 76th Division, from August 1917 until June 1918, he again showed tireless energy, practical resourcefulness, and military attainments of the highest order. Later, as Commander of the 175th Infantry Brigade, 88th Division, he performed his duties with marked ability and excellent judgment.

== Personal life ==
Stewart married Nan Wheelihan of Wisconsin on February 16, 1898. They had one son: Peter.

== Death and legacy ==
Stewart died in St. Augustine, Florida, on July 3, 1934, and was buried at West Point Cemetery.

The USS General M. B. Stewart (AP-140), launched October 1944, was named in his honor.

== Works ==
- Stewart, M.B. (1906) [1900]. The N'th Foot in War. Kansas City, Missouri: Franklin Hudson Press. p. 175.
- Stewart, M.B. (1916) [1903]. Handbook for Noncommissioned Officers of Infantry (5 ed.). Kansas City, Missouri: Franklin Hudson Publishing Company. pp. 132.
- Stewart, Merch Bradt; Davis, Robert Courtney (1905). Notes and Suggestions on the New Infantry Drill Regulations. Kansas City, Missouri: Franklin Hudson Publishing Company. p. 112.
- Stewart, Merch B. (1906) [1905]. "The Army as a Factor in the Building of Society". In Robert, La Follette; Handy, William Matthews; Higgins, Charles (eds.). The Making of America. Vol. 9. Chicago: Making of America Company. p. 152.
- Stewart, M.B. (1913). Military Character, Habit, Deportment, Courtesy and Discipline. Menasha, Wisconsin: George Banta Publishing Company. pp. 70.
- Stewart, Merch Bradt (1913). Physical Development of the Infantry Soldier. Menasha, Wisconsin: George Banta Publishing Company. p. 41.
- Stewart, Merch B.; Moss, James A. (1915). Self-Helps for the Citizen Soldier: Being a Popular Explanation of Things Military. Pen sketches by W.E. Larned. Menasha, Wisconsin: George Banta Publishing Company. pp. 239.
- Stewart, Merch Bradt; Moss, James Alfred (1917). Military Training for Boys: Intended to Develop Body, Character and Patriotism, Prepared for the Use of the National School Camp Association, Inc. Menasha, Wisconsin: George Banta Publishing Company. p. 241.
- Stewart, M.B.; Moss, Jas. A. (1917). Our flag and its message. Appeal by Woodrow Wilson. Philadelphia and London: J.B. Lippincott Company. pp. 31.
- Stewart, M.B. (October 19, 1919). "DEMOCRATIC MILITARY TRAINING". The New York Times. New York City.
- Stewart, M.B.; Waldron, W.H. (1920). Thirty Minute Talks. Washington D.C.: United States Infantry Association. pp. 379.

Military offices
Preceded by Fred Winchester Sladen	Superintendents of the United States Military Academy; 1926–1927	Succeeded by Edwin B. Winans
