= Grant Tinker =

American television executive and businessman (1926–2016)

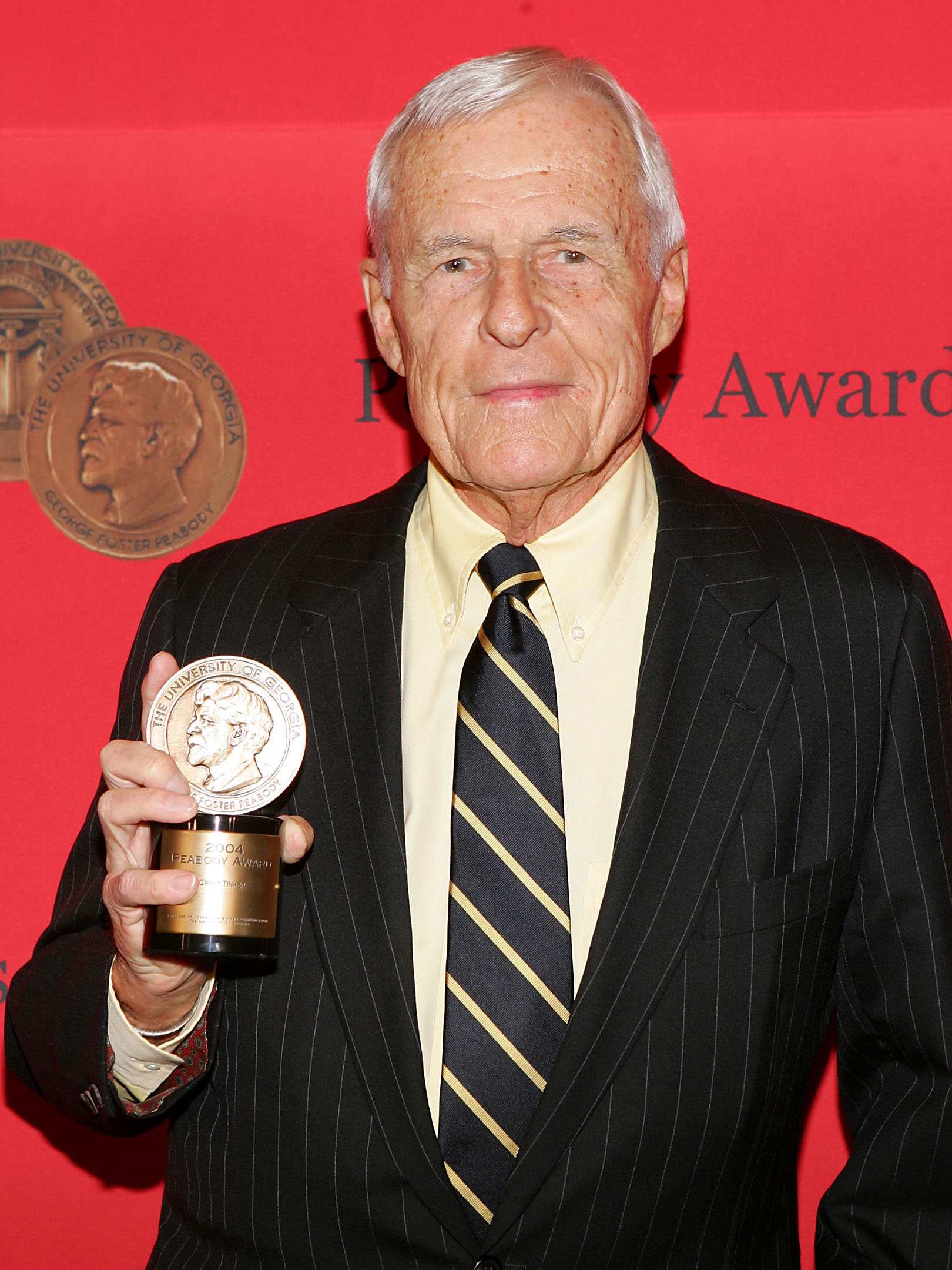
- Tinker at the 64th Annual Peabody Awards, May 2005
- Born: Grant Almerin Tinker; January 11, 1926; Stamford, Connecticut, U.S.
- Died: November 28, 2016 (aged 90); Los Angeles, California, U.S.
- Education: Dartmouth College
- Occupations: Television producer and executive
- Known for: CEO of NBC (1981–86)
- Spouses: Ruth Byerly (m. 1950; div. 1962) Mary Tyler Moore (m. 1962; div. 1981) Brooke Knapp (m. 2004)
- Children: 4, including Mark and John Tinker
- Relatives: Zach Tinker (grandson)
- Awards: Television Hall of Fame (1997)

Grant Almerin Tinker (January 11, 1926 – November 28, 2016) was an American television executive who was chairman and CEO of NBC from 1981 to 1986. Additionally, he was a co-founder of MTM Enterprises and a television producer.

== Early life ==
Tinker was born in Stamford, Connecticut, the middle child of Margaret (née Hessin) and Arthur Almerin Tinker. He had an elder sister, Phyllis (1924–2006), and a younger sister, Joan. During World War II, Tinker served in the United States Army Air Forces Reserve. He graduated from Dartmouth College in 1949.

== Career ==
Shortly after graduation, Tinker joined NBC as an executive trainee, but left in 1954. In 1961, Tinker rejoined NBC and was the head of West Coast programming, where he was involved in developing I Spy, Dr. Kildare, The Man from U.N.C.L.E., the original Star Trek, and Get Smart. Tinker left NBC in 1967 to join Universal Television, only to quit after two years in order to join 20th Century Fox Television in early 1969. In late 1969, he and then-wife Mary Tyler Moore formed the television production company MTM Enterprises. Tinker hired Room 222 writers James L. Brooks and Allan Burns to create and produce the company's first television series, The Mary Tyler Moore Show.

Due to conflicts with running MTM, he left Fox in 1971. MTM produced American sitcoms and drama television series such as Rhoda, The Bob Newhart Show, WKRP in Cincinnati, Hill Street Blues, and St. Elsewhere. In 1981, Tinker left MTM to become the chairman and CEO of NBC, then the perennial last-place American television network (in terms of Nielsen ratings and profits). During Tinker's tenure in NBC's top position, the network regained ratings and commissioned The Cosby Show, Family Ties, The Golden Girls, Cheers, Night Court, and Hill Street Blues. Tinker left the network in 1986, shortly after its parent company RCA was bought by General Electric.

After leaving NBC, Tinker tried to repeat his success with MTM by forming GTG (Grant Tinker-Gannett) Entertainment (formerly T/G Productions), but the business venture failed and the company closed in 1990. The company then partnered with CBS to create a long-term agreement to provide access to the output provided by GTG Entertainment, and it was an exclusive agreement handled between CBS and GTG. The company had also set up subsidiaries like the syndicated television branch GTG Marketing, its East Coast production arm GTG East and the West Coast production arm GTG West, with the first production being produced by the GTG East branch was a syndicated version of the popular USA Today magazine, USA Today on TV, which was distributed to syndicated markets by the GTG Marketing division.

== Personal life ==
Tinker was married three times. In 1950, he married Ruth Byerly, with whom he had three sons and a daughter: Mark (b. 1951), Mike (b. 1952), Jodie (b. 1954) and John (b. 1958). Mark and John are successful television producers. Tinker's marriage to Byerly ended in divorce in 1962. Later that same year, Tinker married actress Mary Tyler Moore, who died in January 2017, two months after Tinker’s death. This marriage also ended in divorce in 1981, though they had separated in 1979, following a 1973 breakup and reconciliation. Tinker's third marriage was in 2004 to aviator Brooke Knapp, to whom he remained married until his death in 2016.

== Death ==
Tinker died at his Los Angeles home on November 28, 2016, at age 90. He is buried at Hillside Cemetery in North Adams, Massachusetts.

== Awards and honors ==
- Tinker was inducted into the Television Hall of Fame in 1997.
- In 2004, Tinker won a personal Peabody Award "for recognizing, protecting, and fostering creativity of the highest order."

Business positions
Preceded by Fred Silverman	CEO of NBC; 1981–1986	Succeeded by Bob Wright
