= 1903–04 RPI men's ice hockey season =

- Conference: Independent

Record
- Overall: 1–0–0
- Conference: 1–0–0
- Neutral: 1–0–0

Coaches and captains
- Captain: Wade Reichard

The 1903–04 RPI men's ice hockey season was the 3rd season of play for the program.

== Season ==
After two years of trying, RPI won its first official game against Union College. After the third consecutive season of just one game the program was shuttered. It would return after two seasons.

Note: Rensselaer's athletic teams were unofficially known as 'Cherry and White' until 1921 when the Engineers moniker debuted for the men's basketball team.

== Roster ==
No.	Nat.	Player	Class	Pos	Height	Weight	DoB	Hometown	Previous team
		Wade Reichard (C)	Junior

== Standings ==
1903–04 Collegiate ice hockey standings
	Intercollegiate							Overall					
	GP	W	L	T	PCT.	GF	GA	GP	W	L	T	GF	GA
Army	0	0	0	0	–	0	0	6	5	1	0	39	9
Brown	4	0	4	0	.000	0	21	5	1	4	0	2	22
City College of New York	–	–	–	–	–	–	–	–	–	–	–	–	–
Columbia	6	4	2	0	.667	19	8	12	5	6	1	30	32
Cornell	1	0	1	0	.000	0	2	1	0	1	0	0	2
Harvard	5	5	0	0	1.000	27	5	6	6	0	0	31	6
Princeton	6	2	3	1	.417	10	12	12	6	5	1	28	25
Rensselaer	1	1	0	0	1.000	6	2	1	1	0	0	6	2
Union	–	–	–	–	–	–	–	4	2	2	0	–	–
Williams	0	0	0	0	–	0	0	4	2	2	0	11	13
Yale	8	4	3	1	.563	29	19	10	4	4	2	36	32

== Schedule and results ==
Date	Opponent	Site	Result	Record
Regular Season
February 21	vs. Union*	Empire Rink • Albany, New York	W 6–2	1–0–0 (1–0–0)
*Non-conference game.
