= Edwin Thayer Barlow =

American architect (1869–1959)

- Born: April 2, 1869; Troy, New York
- Died: April 8, 1959 (aged 90); North Adams, Massachusetts
- Resting place: Hillside Cemetery
- Education: Cornell University
- Occupation: Architect
- Practice: Carrère and Hastings

Edwin Thayer Barlow (April 2, 1869 – July 8, 1959) was an architect with Carrère and Hastings in New York City and at his own architectural practice in North Adams, Massachusetts. He designed a couple of buildings listed on the National Register of Historic Places as well as renovating one that is a contributing property to the Blackinton Historic District. He also designed several school buildings.

== Early life and education ==
Barlow was born in Troy, New York. He attended Drury High School and graduated from Cornell University where he studied architecture in 1891.

== Career ==
Barlow began his career working with H. Neil Wilson of Pittsfield, Massachusetts, designed military buildings in New York for the U.S. Army, and then joined the firm of Carrere and Hastings before launching his own practice in North Adams. He lived at 206 Church Street in North Adams.

== Death and burial ==
He died in North Adams at his home at 206 Church Street and is buried at Hillside Cemetery in North Adams.

== Work ==
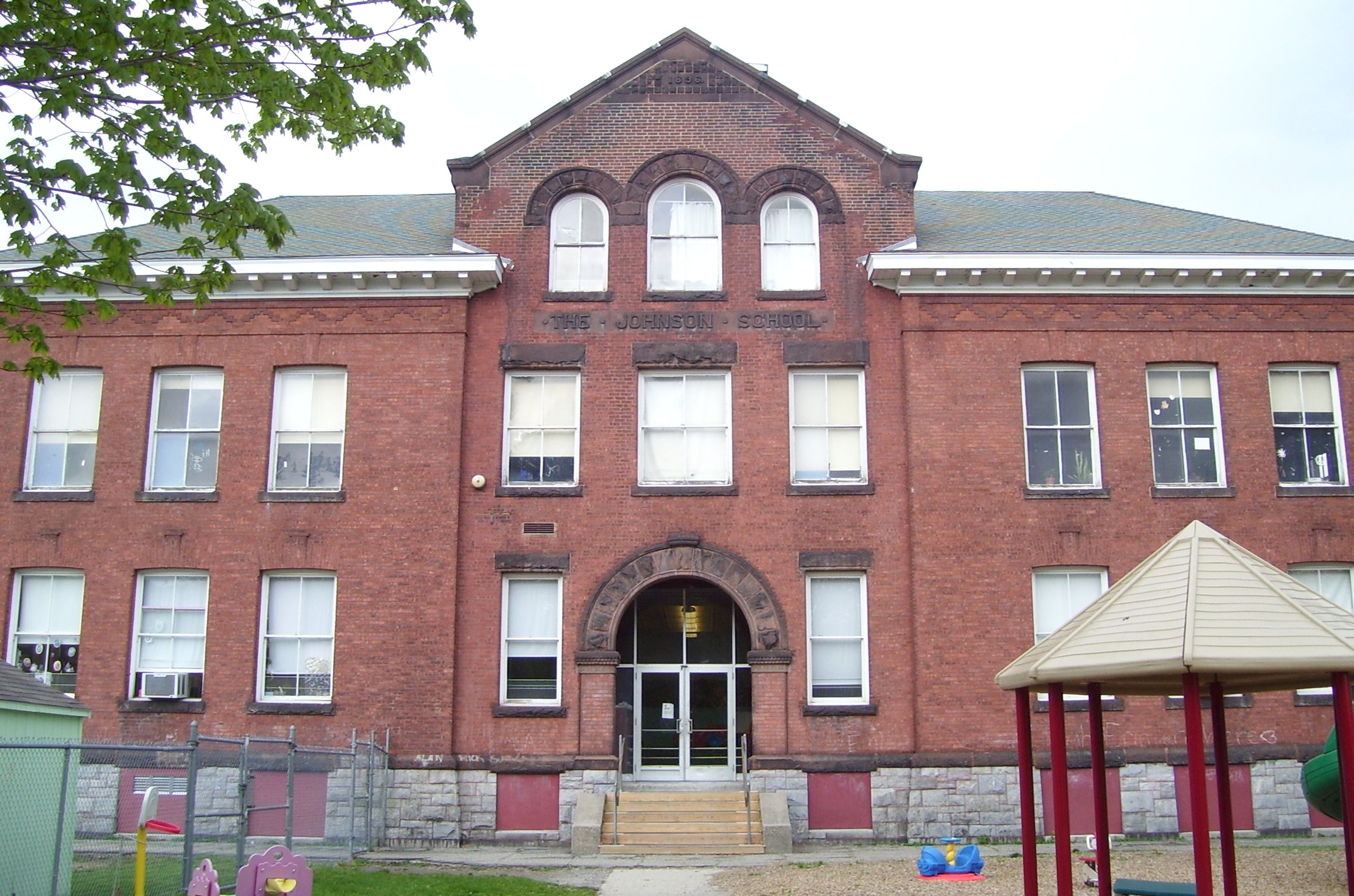
Johnson School in North Adams

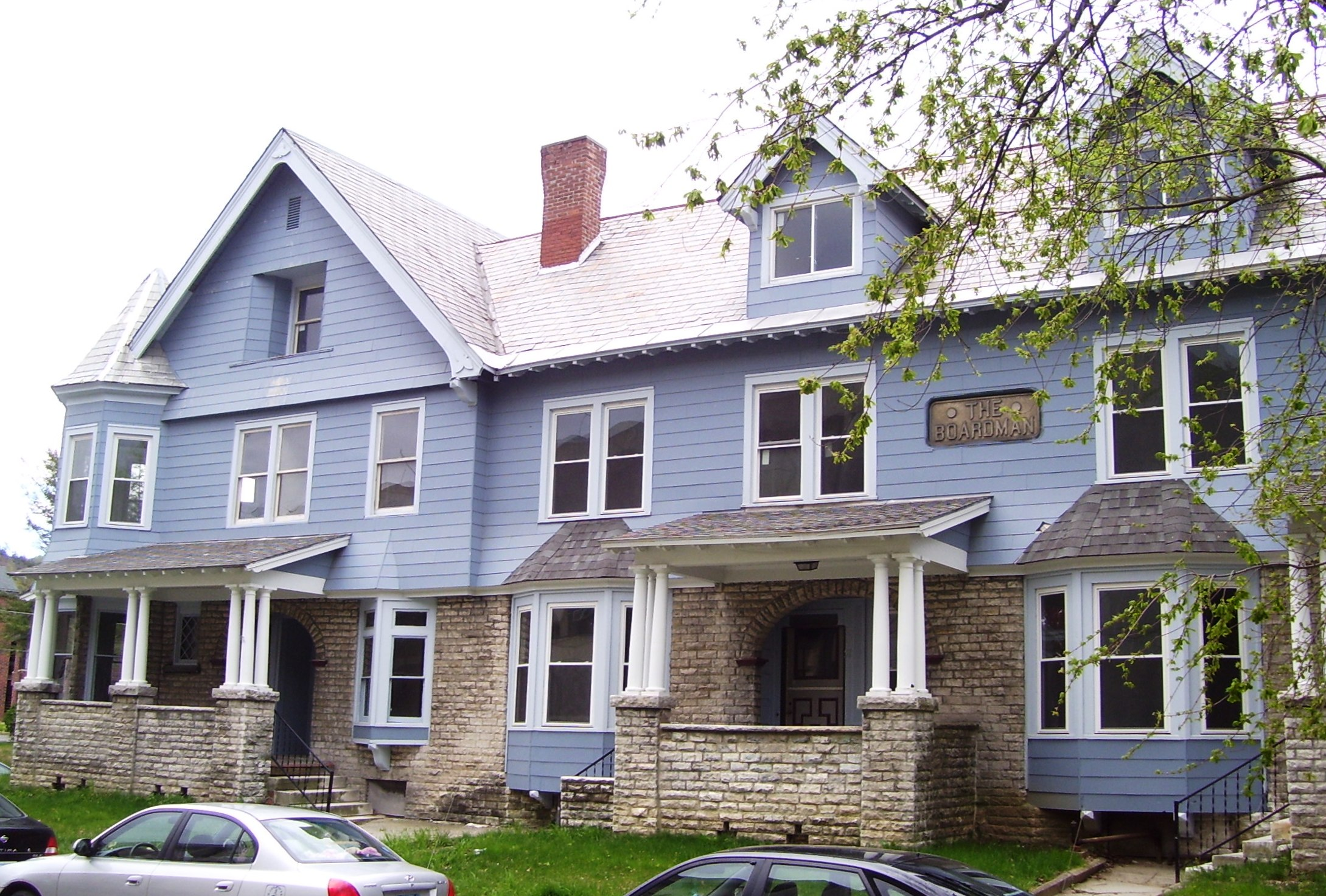
The Boardman in North Adams

- Johnson School (ca. 1898) in North Adams. NRHP listed
- The Boardman (1899) in North Adams. NRHP listed
- Supervising architect for the Blair Building (1902-1903) in New York City, one of the city's earliest skyscrapers
- Involved in marble work at New York Public Library
- Dowlin Block (1895) at 101-107 Main Street in North Adams; the historic building was built for an attorney and includes marble in its facade. It sold in 2017.
- Renovation (1896) of North Adams mill owner Stanford Blackinton's mansion (originally designed by Marcus F. Cummings) into the North Adams Public Library in what is now the Blackinton Historic District
- North Adams YMCA
- Notre Dame School in North Adams
- St. Patrick's Church in Williamstown, Massachusetts
- East Renfrew School in Adams, Massachusetts
