= Brooke Knapp =

American aviation record holder

- Born: Nancy Brooke; 1940 (age 85–86)
- Education: University of California, Los Angeles
- Known for: Setting or breaking more than 100 world aviation speed records
- Spouse(s): Charles W. Knapp (divorced) Grant Tinker (m. 2004; died 2016)

Nancy Brooke Knapp (born 1940) is an American aviator, entrepreneur and Realtor, who set or broke more than 100 world aviation speed records including the fastest speed around the world in a civilian jet aircraft in a Gulfstream III.

== Biography ==
Knapp graduated from Winter Haven (Florida) High School in 1958 under her birth name of Nancy Brooke. Knapp graduated summa cum laude from University of California, Los Angeles.

When she married Charlie Knapp, she was a white-knuckle flyer before he gave her flying lessons. On her 1984 Flight for World's Children, she flew through the People's Republic of China and the Soviet Union, delivering letters of peace and friendship from children in the United States to children around the world and raised almost $1 million for UNICEF. For this accomplishment, she received the Federal Aviation Award for Extraordinary Service, the Paul Tissandier Diploma from the Fédération Aéronautique Internationale and the 1984 Harmon Trophy.

As of 2008 Knapp was a licensed Realtor with Sotheby's International Realty. She served on the Board of Directors of MyJets, Inc. Previously, she founded and operated her own company, Jet Airways, Inc. She received the 2008 Los Angeles Business Journal Community Service Award.
