= 1903–04 United States collegiate men's ice hockey season =

United States ice hockey season

- Duration: December 1903– March 1904
- Collegiate champion: Harvard

The 1903–04 United States collegiate men's ice hockey season was the 10th season of collegiate ice hockey.

== Regular season ==
=== Standings ===
1903–04 Collegiate ice hockey standings
| | Intercollegiate | | | | | | | Overall | | | | | |
| | GP | W | L | T | PCT. | GF | GA | GP | W | L | T | GF | GA |
|---|---|---|---|---|---|---|---|---|---|---|---|---|---|
| Army | 0 | 0 | 0 | 0 | – | 0 | 0 | 6 | 5 | 1 | 0 | 39 | 9 |
| Brown | 4 | 0 | 4 | 0 | .000 | 0 | 21 | 5 | 1 | 4 | 0 | 2 | 22 |
| City College of New York | – | – | – | – | – | – | – | – | – | – | – | – | – |
| Columbia | 6 | 4 | 2 | 0 | .667 | 19 | 8 | 12 | 5 | 6 | 1 | 30 | 32 |
| Cornell | 1 | 0 | 1 | 0 | .000 | 0 | 2 | 1 | 0 | 1 | 0 | 0 | 2 |
| Harvard | 5 | 5 | 0 | 0 | 1.000 | 27 | 5 | 6 | 6 | 0 | 0 | 31 | 6 |
| Princeton | 6 | 2 | 3 | 1 | .417 | 10 | 12 | 12 | 6 | 5 | 1 | 28 | 25 |
| Rensselaer | 1 | 1 | 0 | 0 | 1.000 | 6 | 2 | 1 | 1 | 0 | 0 | 6 | 2 |
| Union | – | – | – | – | – | – | – | 4 | 2 | 2 | 0 | – | – |
| Williams | 0 | 0 | 0 | 0 | – | 0 | 0 | 4 | 2 | 2 | 0 | 11 | 13 |
| Yale | 8 | 4 | 3 | 1 | .563 | 29 | 19 | 10 | 4 | 4 | 2 | 36 | 32 |

1903–04 Intercollegiate Hockey Association standings
| | Conference | | | | | | | | Overall | | | | | |
| | GP | W | L | T | PTS | GF | GA | | GP | W | L | T | GF | GA |
|---|---|---|---|---|---|---|---|---|---|---|---|---|---|---|
| Harvard * | 4 | 4 | 0 | 0 | 8 | 14 | 2 | † | 6 | 6 | 0 | 0 | 31 | 6 |
| Yale | 4 | 3 | 1 | 0 | 6 | 21 | 10 | | 10 | 4 | 4 | 2 | 36 | 32 |
| Columbia | 4 | 2 | 2 | 0 | 4 | 9 | 8 | | 12 | 5 | 6 | 1 | 30 | 32 |
| Princeton | 4 | 1 | 3 | 0 | 2 | 5 | 7 | † | 12 | 6 | 5 | 1 | 28 | 25 |
| Brown | 4 | 0 | 4 | 0 | 0 | 0 | 21 | | 5 | 1 | 4 | 0 | 2 | 22 |
* indicates conference champion † The game between Princeton and Harvard was cancelled due to Princeton's inability to participate. As a result the Tigers were credited with a forfeit for the Intercollegiate Hockey Association standings.
