= Blackinton Historic District =

Historic district in Massachusetts, United States

- U.S. National Register of Historic Places
- U.S. Historic district
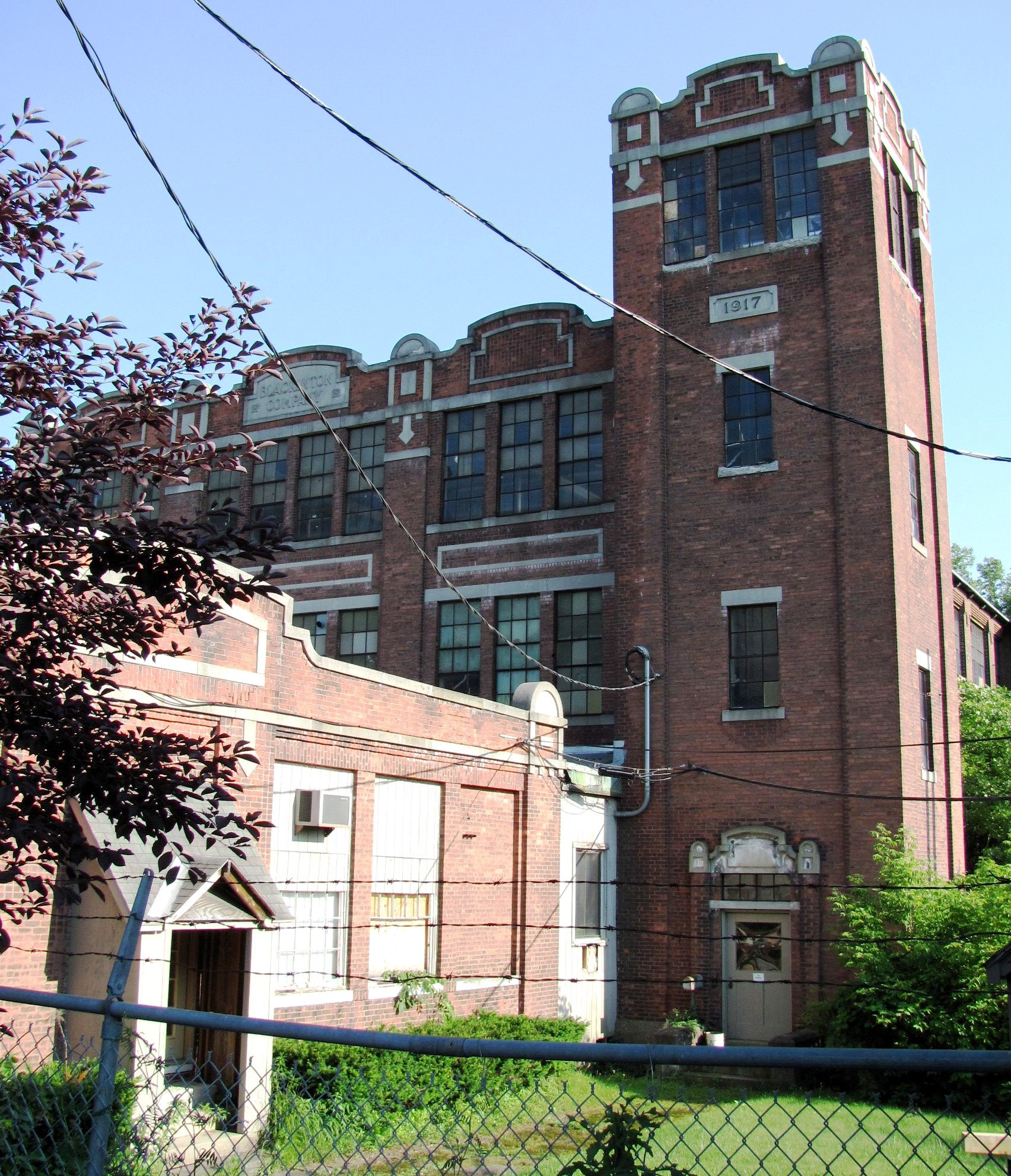
- Blackinton Mill (2010)

- Location within Massachusetts Location within the United States
- Location: Roughly Massachusetts Ave. between Ashton and Doanes Aves. and Church Hill and Boston & Maine RR, North Adams, Massachusetts
- Coordinates: 42°42′13″N 73°9′50″W
- Area: 240 acres (97 ha)
- Architect: various
- Architectural style: Mid-19th Century Revival, Late Victorian
- MPS: North Adams MRA
- NRHP reference No.: 85003384
- Added to NRHP: October 25, 1985

The Blackinton Historic District is a historic district in the western part of North Adams, Massachusetts, roughly along Massachusetts Avenue between Ashton and Doanes Lane and Church Hill and the Boston & Maine Railroad. The district, which encompasses North Adams' best preserved mill village, was added to the National Register of Historic Places in 1985.

== History ==
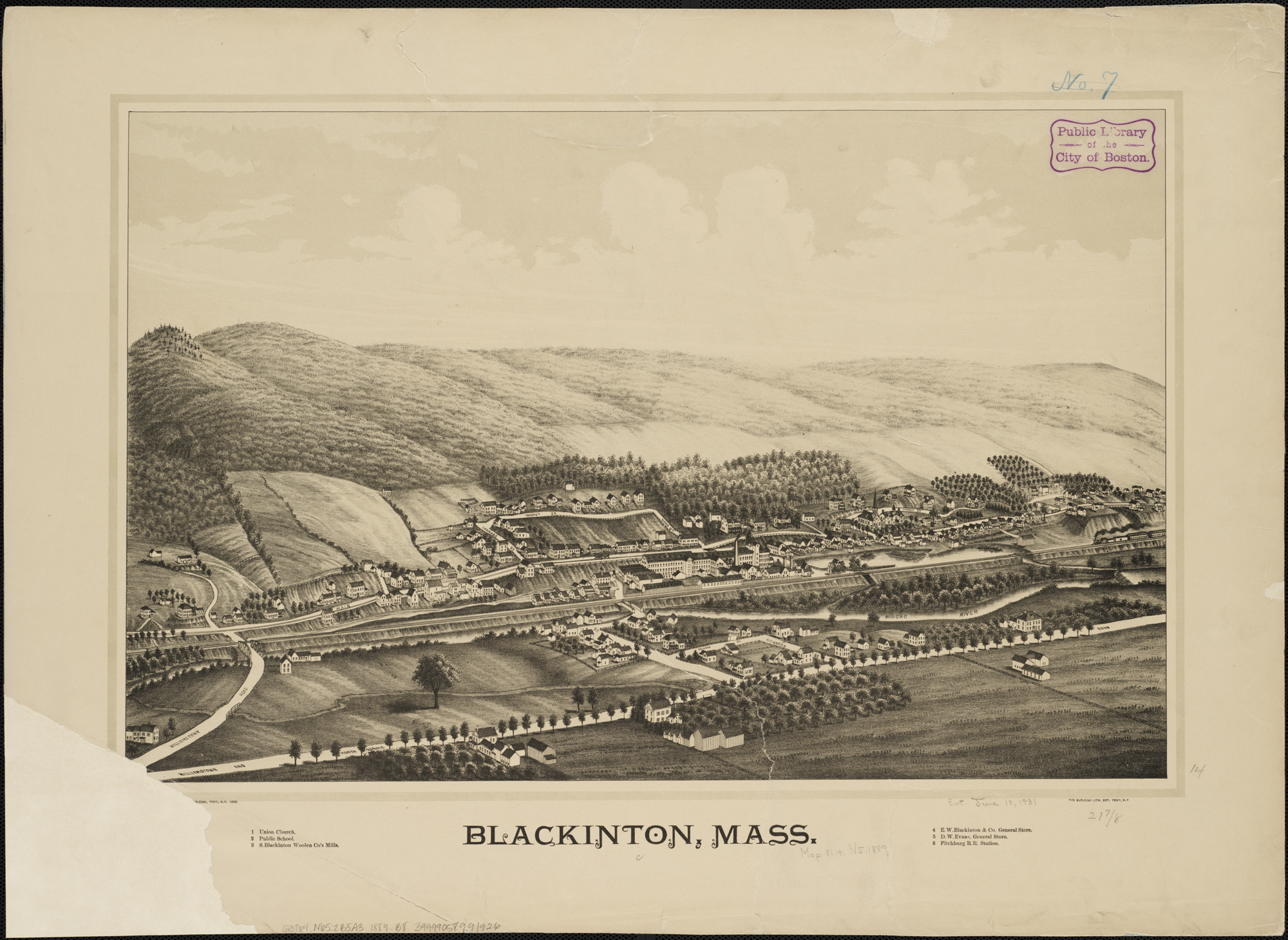
Lithograph of Blackinton from 1889 by L.R. Burleigh with list of landmarks

The neighborhood where the historic district is located is around the mills of the Blackinton Company, founded on the north bank of the Hoosic River in 1821 by Sanford Blackinton, Rufus Wells and J.L White. It was one of the three mill villages, with Greylock and Braytonville, that contributed to the westward expansion of North Adams. It would become one of the largest manufacturers of woolen goods in Western Massachusetts, buoyed especially by large orders from the Union Army during the American Civil War. By the early 1900s the neighborhood was a self-contained community, with its own school, jail, stores, post office, library and fire department, and the people there considered themselves be residents of "Blackinton", not North Adams. The community – which historically had been disputed between North Adams and Williamstown – had a station on the Boston & Maine, as well as bus service to North Adams. The mill closed in 1950.

== Description ==
The historic district is basically linear in character, extending along Massachusetts Avenue west of downtown North Adams and north of the Hoosic River. It extends along the north side between Church Hill and Wood Street, and on the south side east from Ashton Avenue, to about midway between Wood and Church Hill. The district includes the surviving brick mill buildings between Massachusetts Avenue and the river, the 1839 Blackinton Company Store, two churches, and the c. 1850 Greek Revival residence of Sanford Blackinton. There are also fine examples of later Victorian architecture, including a Queen Anne/Stick style home built by John P. Blackinton in 1880 across the street from the mill complex.

== See also ==
- National Register of Historic Places listings in Berkshire County, Massachusetts
