= 291 Broadway =

Commercial skyscraper in Manhattan, New York

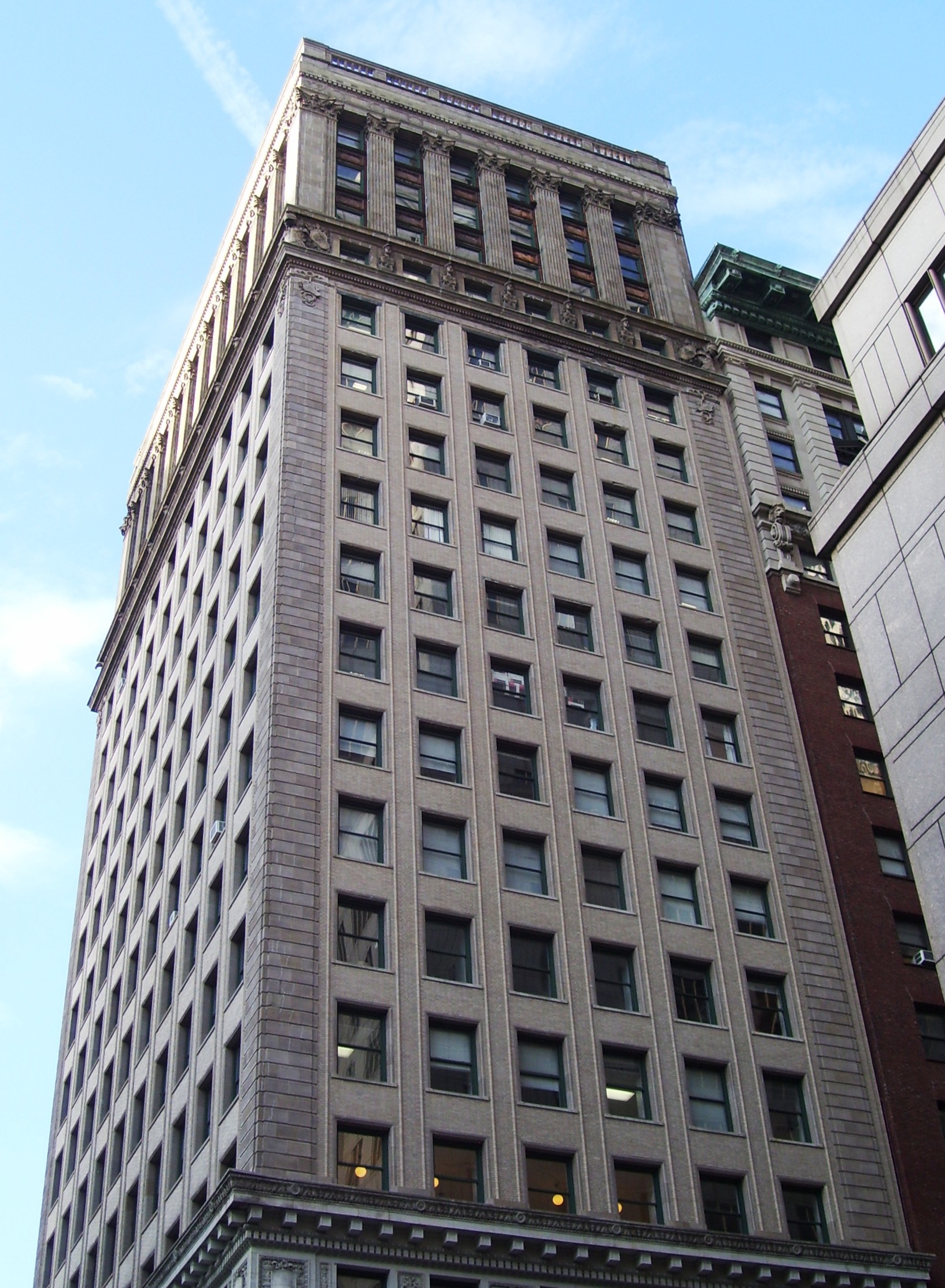
- (2012)
- Interactive map of the 291 Broadway area

General information
- Status: Completed
- Type: Commercial
- Architectural style: Beaux-Arts
- Location: 291 Broadway, Manhattan, New York City
- Coordinates: 40.714928°N 74.006113°W
- Construction started: 1910
- Completed: 1911
- Owner: General Services Administration

Height
- Roof: 252.67 ft (77.01 m)

Technical details
- Floor count: 19
- Floor area: 132,800 sq ft (12,340 m^{2})
- Lifts/elevators: 5

Design and construction
- Architect: Clinton & Russell
- Developer: Linpro New York Realty

291 Broadway, also known as the East River Savings Bank Building, is a 19-story high-rise building located at 291 Broadway and Reade Street in the TriBeCa neighborhood of Lower Manhattan, New York City. Designed by the architecture firm Clinton and Russell, the building originally housed the former East River Savings Bank. It served as the YMCA national headquarters from 1949 to 1980, and also housed the YMCA Historical Library during this time. The YMCA sold the building in 1980 when it decided to move the YMCA National Council to Chicago.

The building's design is inspired by Beaux-Arts architecture and the Historism style, and contains a light stone facade. Around the base of the building, carved columns and medallions add character, along with stone fencing along the roof.

On April 27, 2026, the facade of the building partially collapsed, causing debris to fall on Reade Street.
