= Minnesota State High School League =

High school activities governing organization

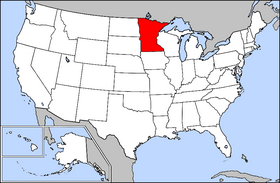
- Abbreviation: MSHSL
- Formation: 1916
- Type: Volunteer; NPO
- Legal status: Association
- Purpose: Athletic/Educational
- Headquarters: 2100 Freeway Blvd. Brooklyn Center, MN 55430
- Region served: Minnesota
- Members: 601 schools
- Executive Director: Erich Martens
- Affiliations: National Federation of State High School Associations
- Staff: 24
- Website: mshsl.org

The Minnesota State High School League (MSHSL) is a voluntary, non-profit association for the support and governance of interscholastic activities at high schools in the U.S. state of Minnesota. The association supports interscholastic athletics and fine arts programs for member schools. Membership includes nearly 500 schools, including special schools, home schools, and 435 high schools. The State High School League is an affiliate of the National Federation of State High School Associations (NFHS).

The League also addresses sportsmanship, chemical health, scholarship recognition, and oversees tournament officials and judges. The League provides educational programs for coaches. The organization's operating revenue is derived from tournament ticket sales, broadcast rights, corporate sponsorship, and sale of tournament merchandise.

== History ==
The MSHSL was founded in 1916 as the State High School Athletic Association (SHSAA) in order to promote and regulate school athletics. It later expanded its mission to include fine arts programs. In 1922, SHSAA joined the National Federation of State High School Associations. In 1929, the State High School Athletic Association adopted a new name, the Minnesota State High School League, as well as a new vision. The League started accepting non-public schools' applications for admitance in 1974.

In 1960, the MSHSL was sanctioned as a non-profit by a Minnesota State Statute. In 1977, the Minnesota Associated Press Sports Editors began broadcasting Minnesota State High School League scores for football state championships and ice hockey state championships via wire service, in addition to publishing a weekly column on high school football.

Beginning with the 2015 season, the MSHSL created geographic football districts for regular season scheduling. The change was designed to help programs having difficulty finding opponents for an eight-game schedule.

The MSHSL was the first state association to officially sanction women's hockey, adapted athletics, robotics, and clay target.

== Classifications ==
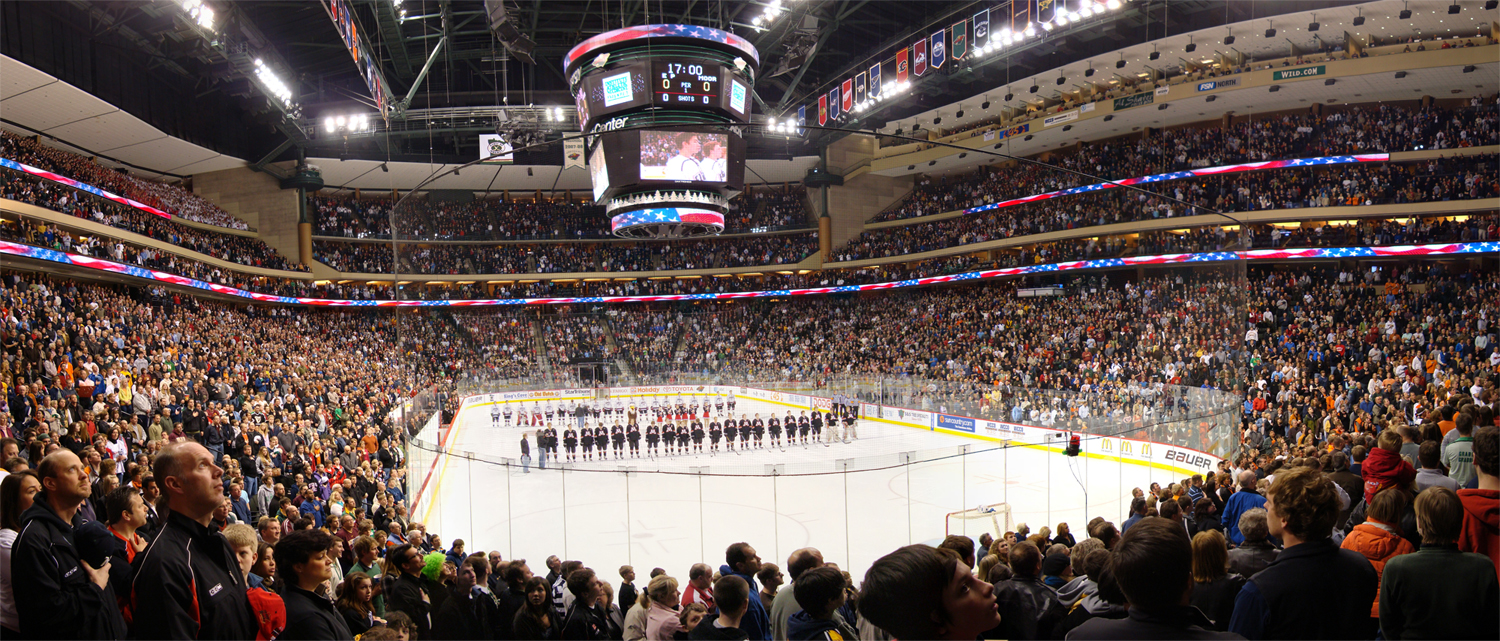
2009 Boys AA Championship game at the Xcel Energy Center.

On April 17, 1975, the member schools of the Minnesota State High School League approved amendments that provided the changes necessary to implement reorganization for two class competition. Prior to this, schools of all sizes were competing against each other. The idea behind the division was to reduce the inherent advantage that was given to the larger schools. The Board of Directors assigned the largest 128 schools by enrollment to the AA classification. All other member schools were assigned to Class A. Each class is then split into eight sections, with the number of teams in each section varying. In April 1983 the Board of Directors adopted a policy which assigned schools with a minimum enrollment of 500 students to Class AA and schools with an enrollment 1–499 to Class A. Depending on the number of schools participating in an activity, additional classes may be needed or no class system may be needed at all. The highest current class in any activity is AAAAAA (6A) for football.

== Postseason ==
=== Section tournaments ===
At the end of the regular season, every MSHSL team is seeded into a sectional tournament. For each class, the state is divided into 8 sections. Every two years, the MSHSL determines a school's activity classification and section placement. Different sections have different numbers of teams depending upon the class and activity in question. For example, most sections in football have 8 teams. In a typical 8-team section, all 8 teams will make the playoffs regardless of their regular season record. If a football section has 9 teams, then the ninth team will not make the playoffs. In all other sports, every team advances to the postseason. In basketball, for Classes AAAA and AAA, a typical section has 8 team, whereas a typical section in Class AA has about 16 teams, and a Class A section can have 20 or more. In these cases where a section has more or less teams than an even 8 or 16, higher seeded teams may receive byes, or lower seeded teams may have to play an extra play-in game. The other option is for a section to be divided into two 8-team (or more) sub-sections with the sub-section champions playing for the section title.

These sections are strictly geographical, and are normally numbered from Southeast to Northwest. Thus, with football, for example, Section 1AAA would have schools in Class AAA that are from the Southeastern part of the state, while Section 7AAAA will have Class AAAA schools from the Northeastern part of the state. As a general rule, this serves pretty well, however it breaks down when dealing with the larger classes. In Class AAAAA Football, given the concentration of large schools in the Twin Cities Metro, Section 1AAAAA comprises the three Rochester public schools, Owatonna, and two southern suburbs. At the other end, Section 8AAAAA covers the entire northern half of the state with Bemidji, Brainerd, Moorhead, Sartell, Alexandria, and one of the St. Cloud public schools. Sections 2AAAAA-7AAAAA are a mixture of suburbs, exurbs and Minneapolis/St. Paul schools.

Each section has its own methods and procedures for determining seeding in the section tournament. Some sections use elaborate point systems while others base seeding simply on records. The winner of the section tournament advances to State.

=== State tournaments ===
The winners of the section tournaments are seeded into a single elimination state tournament. Pairings of section champion at State are predetermined before the season by the MSHSL. In the Fall of 2005, the MSHSL experimented by having coaches seed the State Soccer Tournament.

== Activities ==
The following sports are offered under the supervision of the MSHSL. All of these sports have a single elimination tournament at the end of the season which awards a state championship to the winning team. Some sports also award individual championships as well.

Sports
Fall	Classes	Winter	Classes	Spring	Classes
Adapted Soccer	CI PI	Adapted Floor Hockey	CI PI	Adapted Bowling	ASD CI PI
Tennis, Girls	A AA	Nordic Ski Racing, Boys and Girls	None	Adapted Softball	CI PI
Soccer, Boys and Girls	A AA; AAA	Hockey, Boys and Girls	A AA	Golf, Boys and Girls	A AA; AAA
Cross Country, Boys and Girls	A AA; AAA	Alpine Skiing, Boys and Girls	None	Track and Field, Boys and Girls	A AA; AAA
Volleyball, Girls	A AA; AAA	Dance Team, Girls	A AA; AAA	Softball, Girls	A AA; AAA; AAAA
Football	9-man A AA; AAA; AAAA; AAAAA; AAAAAA	Wrestling	A AA; AAA	Baseball, Boys	A AA; AAA; AAAA
Swimming and Diving, Girls	A AA	Swimming and Diving, Boys	A AA	Synchronised swimming, Girls	None
		Basketball, Boys and Girls	A AA; AAA; AAAA	Lacrosse, Boys and Girls	None
		Gymnastics, Girls	A AA	Tennis, Boys	A AA
				Clay Target	None
				Badminton, Girls	None

Activities
Fall	Classes	Winter	Classes	Spring	Classes
		One Act Play	A AA	Speech	A AA
		Debate	None	Visual Arts	A AA
				Music	A AA
				Robotics	None

== Conferences ==
Because of the large number of high schools and large distances spanned between some of them, many schools are organized into conferences. These conferences, which, according to Minnesota State High School League rules, must have a minimum of five members, are usually composed of schools that are in close geographic proximity and have similar enrollments. During the regular season, a school plays a number of its games against other teams in its conference (this number varies depending on the sport and conference in question). However, unlike with organizations such as the California Interscholastic Federation or Wisconsin Interscholastic Athletic Association, a team's conference standing has no bearing on its postseason. Since every team makes the playoffs and seeding is done at the discretion of the section, a team's conference performance has no direct effect on its postseason fate. A team could win its conference, but still be seeded lower than teams that finished behind it due to other considerations such as overall record, or the strength of opponents. Often, teams from one conference are spread over different sections and sometimes different classes. Some single sport conferences also exist, especially for hockey.

== Alumni ==
The following athletes are among those who were in Minnesota State High School League activities in high school:

Baseball

- Joe Mauer - Cretin-Derham Hall
- Dave Winfield - Saint Paul Central

Basketball

- Paul Sather - Princeton
- Kris Humphries - Hopkins
- Paige Bueckers - Hopkins
- Tessa Johnson - St. Michael-Albertville
- Tre Jones - Apple Valley
- Tyus Jones - Apple Valley
- Mark Olberding - Melrose
- Kevin McHale - Hibbing
- Khalid El-Amin - Minneapolis North
- Lindsay Whalen - Hutchinson
- Rashad Vaughn - Robbinsdale Cooper
- Gary Trent Jr. - Apple Valley

Hockey

- Matt Cullen - Moorhead
- Neal Broten - Roseau
- Jake Gardiner - Minnetonka
- Taylor Heise - Red Wing
- Nick Leddy - Eden Prairie
- Gigi Marvin - Warroad
- T.J. Oshie - Warroad
- Brock Nelson - Warroad
- Nate Prosser - Elk River
- Anne Schleper - St. Cloud Cathedral
- Nate Schmidt - St. Cloud Cathedral
- Krissy Wendell - Park Center
- Alex Stalock - South St. Paul
- Justin Faulk - South St. Paul
- Bobby Brink - Minnetonka
- K'Andre Miller - Minnetonka

Football

- Adam Thielen - Detroit Lakes
- Eric Decker - Rocori-Cold Spring
- Chris Weinke - Cretin-Derham Hall
- James Laurinaitis - Wayzata
- John Carlson- Litchfield
- Karl Klug- Caledonia
- Isaac Fruechte- Caledonia
- Frank Ragnow - Chanhassen
- Amani Hooker - Park Center
- Larry Fitzgerald - Academy of Holy Angels
- C. J. Ham - Duluth Denfeld
- Tom Compton - Rosemount
- Billy Turner (American football) - Mounds View
- Joe Haeg - Brainerd
- Maxx Williams - Waconia
- Tyler Johnson - Minneapolis North
- Dillon Radunz - Becker
- Beau Allen - Minnetonka

Other Sports

- Payton Otterdahl, Track and Field -Rosemount
- Regan Smith, Swimming - Lakeville North
- Jordan Thompson, Volleyball - Edina
