= 1914–15 Dartmouth men's ice hockey season =

- Conference: Independent
- Home ice: Occom Pond

Record
- Overall: 4–3–0
- Home: 1–0–0
- Road: 1–3–0
- Neutral: 2–0–0

Coaches and captains
- Head coach: Fred Rocque
- Captain: Leon Tuck

The 1914–15 Dartmouth men's ice hockey season was the 10th season of play for the program.

== Season ==
After two very successful seasons it appeared that Dartmouth was going to have a down year when it dropped its first two games of the season. The loss to defending Canadian champion Ottawa wasn't unexpected and it gave the team a good foundation when they began their season with a 4-2 win over MAC. After defeating defending champion Princeton 4–1 the team entered a showdown with Harvard which was expected to determine the champion for the season.

Despite not being part of the big three, Dartmouth had challenged the powers over the previous two seasons but the team had yet to defeat the Crimson. In their ninth meeting, the Greens finally broke through on the strength of a hat-trick from Wanamaker and dispatched Harvard. After a succeeding win over MIT, Dartmouth entered their final collegiate game of the season against Yale with a championship waiting on the other side. Unfortunately, the Elis were equal to the task and the two fought to a 1-1 draw after 40 minutes. The teams agreed to two 5-minute overtime periods and, after Yale scored in the first, Dartmouth began pressing to even the score in the second. Unfortunately the Greens were called for a penalty and the Elis scored twice with the man-advantage to put the game out of reach.

Dartmouth lost their final game almost three weeks later, but it was the loss to Yale that was dire. Losing to the Elis meant that Dartmouth could not claim the championship but, because Harvard had triumphed over Yale, none of the three teams could lay claim to the title. There was a brief attempt to schedule additional for the three at the end of the year but because Harvard had already disbanded their team, nothing came to fruition.

Note: Dartmouth College did not possess a moniker for its athletic teams until the 1920s, however, the university had adopted 'Dartmouth Green' as its school color in 1866.

== Roster ==
| No. | Nat. | Player | Class | Pos | Height | Weight | DoB | Hometown | Previous team |
|---|---|---|---|---|---|---|---|---|---|
| | | John P. Bowler | Senior | C |
| | (United States) | George C. Currier | Sophomore | D | | | 1895-09-21 | Arlington, Massachusetts |
| | (United States) | Lewis H. Cousens | Junior | D | | | 1894-04-05 | Arlington, Massachusetts | Arlington Catholic |
| | (United States) | Arthur I. Donahue | Senior | G | | | | Medford, Massachusetts |
| | (United States) | Howard Fahey | Senior | F | 5' 7" (1.7 m) | 146 lb (66 kg) | 1892-06-24 | Medford, Massachusetts |
| | (United States) | Burton L. Gale Jr. | Sophomore | RW | | | 1894-12-05 | Warren, Pennsylvania |
| | (United States) | Carl N. Holmes | Junior | LW | | | | Somerville, Massachusetts |
| | (United States) | Harris F. Murchie | Junior | D | | | | Maine |
| | (United States) | Wendell G. Reycroft | Sophomore | C | | | 1894-05-11 | Arlington, Massachusetts | Arlington High School |
| | (United States) | Leon P. Tuck (C) | Senior | C/D | 5' 9" (1.75 m) | 181 lb (82 kg) | 1891-05-25 | Winchester, Massachusetts |
| | (United States) | Ralph Tyler | Sophomore | C/RW | | | | Exeter, New Hampshire |
| | (United States) | Clarence L. Wanamaker | Senior | R | | | 1892-08-03 | Melrose, Massachusetts |
| | (United States) | Lawrence A. Whitney | Senior | | | | 1891-02-02 | Millbury, Massachusetts |

== Standings ==
1914–15 Collegiate ice hockey standings
| | Intercollegiate | | | | | | | Overall | | | | | |
| | GP | W | L | T | PCT. | GF | GA | GP | W | L | T | GF | GA |
|---|---|---|---|---|---|---|---|---|---|---|---|---|---|
| Army | 3 | 0 | 3 | 0 | .000 | 3 | 11 | 5 | 1 | 4 | 0 | 7 | 13 |
| Columbia | 4 | 2 | 2 | 0 | .500 | 7 | 16 | 4 | 2 | 2 | 0 | 7 | 16 |
| Cornell | 4 | 1 | 3 | 0 | .250 | 11 | 17 | 4 | 1 | 3 | 0 | 11 | 17 |
| Dartmouth | 5 | 4 | 1 | 0 | .800 | 16 | 10 | 7 | 4 | 3 | 0 | 20 | 17 |
| Harvard | 9 | 8 | 1 | 0 | .889 | 49 | 16 | 13 | 9 | 4 | 0 | 51 | 22 |
| Massachusetts Agricultural | 10 | 5 | 5 | 0 | .500 | 32 | 22 | 10 | 5 | 5 | 0 | 32 | 22 |
| MIT | 5 | 0 | 5 | 0 | .000 | 6 | 20 | 6 | 0 | 6 | 0 | 6 | 28 |
| Princeton | 9 | 4 | 5 | 0 | .444 | 17 | 24 | 12 | 6 | 6 | 0 | 28 | 34 |
| Rensselaer | 3 | 0 | 3 | 0 | .000 | 0 | 14 | 3 | 0 | 3 | 0 | 0 | 14 |
| Trinity | – | – | – | – | – | – | – | – | – | – | – | – | – |
| Williams | 7 | 4 | 3 | 0 | .571 | 14 | 17 | 7 | 4 | 3 | 0 | 14 | 17 |
| WPI | – | – | – | – | – | – | – | – | – | – | – | – | – |
| Yale | 10 | 7 | 3 | 0 | .700 | 32 | 21 | 16 | 9 | 7 | 0 | 56 | 43 |
| YMCA College | – | – | – | – | – | – | – | – | – | – | – | – | – |

== Schedule and results ==
| Date | Opponent | Site | Result | Record |
Regular Season
| December 25 | at Ottawa* | Dey's Arena • Ottawa, Ontario | L 2–3 ^{OT} | 0–1–0 |
| December 31 | vs. Massachusetts Agricultural* | Boston Arena • Boston, Massachusetts | W 4–2 | 1–1–0 |
| January 13 | vs. Princeton* | Boston Arena • Boston, Massachusetts | W 4–1 | 2–1–0 |
| January 20 | at Harvard* | Boston Arena • Boston, Massachusetts | W 4–2 | 3–1–0 |
| February 4 | MIT* | Occom Pond • Hanover, New Hampshire | W 4–1 | 4–1–0 |
| February 8 | at Yale* | New Haven Arena • New Haven, Connecticut | L 1–4 ^{2OT} | 4–2–0 |
| February 27 | at St. Nicholas Hockey Club* | St. Nicholas Rink • New York, New York | L 1–4 | 4–3–0 |
*Non-conference game.
