= 1914–15 RPI men's ice hockey season =

- Conference: Independent

Record
- Overall: 0–3–0
- Home: 0–2–0
- Road: 0–1–0

Coaches and captains
- Captain: Everett Page

The 1914–15 RPI men's ice hockey season was the 12th season of play for the program.

== Season ==
For the third consecutive season Rensselaer failed to win a single game.

Note: Rensselaer's athletic teams were unofficially known as 'Cherry and White' until 1921 when the Engineers moniker debuted for the men's basketball team.

== Roster ==
No.	Nat.	Player	Class	Pos	Height	Weight	DoB	Hometown	Previous team
		Everett Page (C)

== Standings ==
1914–15 Collegiate ice hockey standings
	Intercollegiate							Overall					
	GP	W	L	T	PCT.	GF	GA	GP	W	L	T	GF	GA
Army	3	0	3	0	.000	3	11	5	1	4	0	7	13
Columbia	4	2	2	0	.500	7	16	4	2	2	0	7	16
Cornell	4	1	3	0	.250	11	17	4	1	3	0	11	17
Dartmouth	5	4	1	0	.800	16	10	7	4	3	0	20	17
Harvard	9	8	1	0	.889	49	16	13	9	4	0	51	22
Massachusetts Agricultural	10	5	5	0	.500	32	22	10	5	5	0	32	22
MIT	5	0	5	0	.000	6	20	6	0	6	0	6	28
Princeton	9	4	5	0	.444	17	24	12	6	6	0	28	34
Rensselaer	3	0	3	0	.000	0	14	3	0	3	0	0	14
Trinity	–	–	–	–	–	–	–	–	–	–	–	–	–
Williams	7	4	3	0	.571	14	17	7	4	3	0	14	17
WPI	–	–	–	–	–	–	–	–	–	–	–	–	–
Yale	10	7	3	0	.700	32	21	16	9	7	0	56	43
YMCA College	–	–	–	–	–	–	–	–	–	–	–	–	–

== Schedule and results ==
Date	Opponent	Site	Result	Record
Regular Season
December 19	Massachusetts Agricultural*	RPI Rink • Troy, New York	L 0–8	0–1–0
February 13	at Williams*	Weston Field Rink • Williamstown, Massachusetts	L 0–3	0–2–0
February 20	YMCA College*	RPI Rink • Troy, New York	L 0–3	0–3–0
*Non-conference game.
