= 1914–15 Harvard Crimson men's ice hockey season =

College ice hockey season

Intercollegiate Hockey League, Champion
- Conference: 1st IHL
- Home ice: Boston Arena

Record
- Overall: 9–4–0
- Conference: 4–0–0
- Home: 7–4–0
- Road: 1–0–0
- Neutral: 1–0–0

Coaches and captains
- Head coach: Alfred Winsor
- Captain: William Claflin

The 1914–15 Harvard Crimson men's ice hockey season was the 18th season of play for the program.

== Season ==
With Hobey Baker now graduated, there was an open question as to which was the leading team in college hockey. After a subpar end to their season, Harvard had ample reason to reclaim the intercollegiate championship.

The Crimson began the year with a convincing 6–2 win over MIT, scoring the first six goals and using the remainder of the game to ease their alternates into game action. The team lost a match against the Boston Athletic Association before pausing for the winter break.

Harvard lost their first game back but recovered a few days later with a dominant performance against Cornell. The first big test for the team was against defending champion Princeton, but the Tigers were missing far too many players from the previous year to put up much of a fight. With Harvard sailing towards a championship they were shocked in their very next game by Dartmouth. Without a second game against the Greens, Harvard could only hope that Dartmouth would lose to keep the championship dreams alive.

A sterling performance from Wylde allowed Harvard to complete the season sweep of Princeton. A week later the Elis came to town and Harvard once more proved the better team. After a shutout of Mass. Agg. Harvard was stymied by McGill, as they had been the year before, but the ensuing 9–1 win over Williams demonstrated that the Crimson was still atop their game.

Harvard has an eleven day layoff leading to their rematch with Yale, and the game could scarce have meant more. Harvard was one win away from the IHL championship and, because of the Bulldogs' win over Dartmouth at the beginning of the month, the Crimson could finish with a 3-way split for the collegiate championship as well. Harvard's defense proved stout once more as the Crimson skated to a 3–1 win capturing the season series.

With Harvard, Dartmouth and Yale having defeated one another during the season, none had a solid claim for the Intercollegiate championship. A playoff was suggested to determine the sole champion between the three, however, Harvard disbanded their team shortly after defeating Yale with the expectation that the team would claim the championship.

== Roster ==
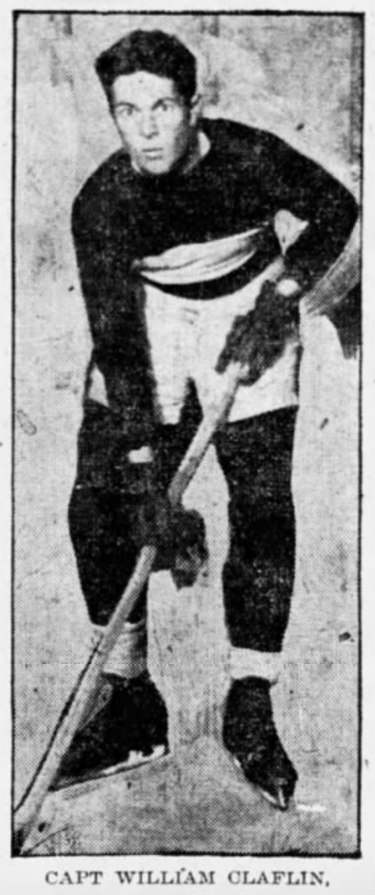
William Claflin ca. 1914

No.	Nat.	Player	Class	Pos	Height	Weight	DoB	Hometown	Previous team
		Ames	Sophomore	RW
	(United States)	Edwin O. Baker	Sophomore	C			1896-02-21	Cambridge, Massachusetts	Cambridge Latin School
	(United States)	Robert Baldwin	Sophomore	C/RW	5' 10" (1.78 m)	140 lb (64 kg)	1895-04-09	Wellesley Hills, Massachusetts	Volkmann School
	(United States)	Henry M. Bliss	Sophomore	RW			1895-06-11	Chestnut Hill, Massachusetts	Volkmann School
	(United States)	William H. Claflin Jr. (C)	Senior	D	5' 8" (1.73 m)	156 lb (71 kg)	1893-06-08	Swampscott, Massachusetts	Noble and Greenough School
	(United States)	Clarence Clark	Junior	D		165 lb (75 kg)	1893-02-11	Germantown, Pennsylvania	Milton Academy
	(United States)	Alan Cunningham	Junior	D	5' 10" (1.78 m)	165 lb (75 kg)	1895-01-11	Boston, Massachusetts	Noble and Greenough School
	(United States)	Laurence Curtis II	Junior	D		172 lb (78 kg)	1893-09-03	Boston, Massachusetts	Groton School
	(United States)	Augustus Doty	Junior	D		193 lb (88 kg)	1894-01-20	Waltham, Massachusetts	St. Paul's School
	(United States)	Thomas K. Fisher	Sophomore	C			1894-01-11	Clinton, Massachusetts	St. Paul's School
	(United States)	Richard Harte	Sophomore	G			1894-02-01	Philadelphia, Pennsylvania	Pomfret School
	(United States)	Gustav Kissel	Sophomore	RW			1895-03-03	Washington, D.C.	Milton Academy
	(United States)	John E. P. Morgan	Sophomore	D	5' 8" (1.73 m)	159 lb (72 kg)	1895-08-09	Lenox, Massachusetts	Middlesex School
	(United States)	Morgan B. Phillips	Senior	C	5' 9" (1.75 m)	179 lb (81 kg)	1894-10-22	Newton Center, Massachusetts	Milton Academy
	(United States)	Greenough Townsend	Sophomore	C	5' 8" (1.73 m)	145 lb (66 kg)	1895-03-04	New York, New York	St. Paul's School
	(United States)	Elmer Wanamaker	Junior	C/LW		155 lb (70 kg)	1893-10-11	Wakefield, Massachusetts	Melrose High
	(United States)	John Wylde	Sophomore	G	6' 0" (1.83 m)	144 lb (65 kg)	1893-08-26	Jamaica Plain, Massachusetts	Noble and Greenough School

== Standings ==
1914–15 Collegiate ice hockey standings
	Intercollegiate							Overall					
	GP	W	L	T	PCT.	GF	GA	GP	W	L	T	GF	GA
Army	3	0	3	0	.000	3	11	5	1	4	0	7	13
Columbia	4	2	2	0	.500	7	16	4	2	2	0	7	16
Cornell	4	1	3	0	.250	11	17	4	1	3	0	11	17
Dartmouth	5	4	1	0	.800	16	10	7	4	3	0	20	17
Harvard	9	8	1	0	.889	49	16	13	9	4	0	51	22
Massachusetts Agricultural	10	5	5	0	.500	32	22	10	5	5	0	32	22
MIT	5	0	5	0	.000	6	20	6	0	6	0	6	28
Princeton	9	4	5	0	.444	17	24	12	6	6	0	28	34
Rensselaer	3	0	3	0	.000	0	14	3	0	3	0	0	14
Trinity	–	–	–	–	–	–	–	–	–	–	–	–	–
Williams	7	4	3	0	.571	14	17	7	4	3	0	14	17
WPI	–	–	–	–	–	–	–	–	–	–	–	–	–
Yale	10	7	3	0	.700	32	21	16	9	7	0	56	43
YMCA College	–	–	–	–	–	–	–	–	–	–	–	–	–

1914–15 Intercollegiate Hockey League standings
	Conference								Overall					
	GP	W	L	T	PTS	SW	GF	GA	GP	W	L	T	GF	GA
Harvard *	4	4	0	0	1.000	2	16	5	13	9	4	0	51	22
Yale	5	2	3	0	.400	1	10	11	16	9	7	0	56	43
Princeton	5	1	4	0	.200	0	6	16	12	6	6	0	28	34
* indicates conference champion

== Schedule and results ==
Date	Opponent	Site	Result	Record
Regular season
December 17	vs. MIT*	Boston Arena • Boston, Massachusetts	W 6–2	1–0–0
December 19	vs. Boston Athletic Association*	Boston Arena • Boston, Massachusetts	L 1–3	1–1–0
January 6	Queen's*	Boston Arena • Boston, Massachusetts	L 1–2	1–2–0
January 9	Cornell*	Boston Arena • Boston, Massachusetts	W 8–1	2–2–0
January 16	vs. Princeton	St. Nicholas Rink • New York, New York	W 4–1	3–2–0 (1–0–0)
January 20	Dartmouth*	Boston Arena • Boston, Massachusetts	L 2–4	3–3–0
January 23	Princeton	Boston Arena • Boston, Massachusetts	W 5–1	4–3–0 (2–0–0)
January 30	Yale	Boston Arena • Boston, Massachusetts (Rivalry)	W 4–2	5–3–0 (3–0–0)
February 3	Massachusetts Agricultural*	Boston Arena • Boston, Massachusetts	W 4–0	6–3–0
February 5	McGill*	Boston Arena • Boston, Massachusetts	L 0–1	6–4–0
February 9	Williams*	Boston Arena • Boston, Massachusetts	W 9–1	7–4–0
February 12	St. Nicholas Hockey Club*	Boston Arena • Boston, Massachusetts	W 4–3	8–4–0
February 23	at Yale	New Haven Arena • New Haven, Connecticut (Rivalry)	W 3–1	9–4–0 (4–0–0)
*Non-conference game.
