= 1914–15 Cornell Big Red men's ice hockey season =

- Home ice: Beebe Lake

Record
- Overall: 1–3–0
- Home: 0–1–0
- Road: 1–1–0
- Neutral: 0–2–0

Coaches and captains
- Head coach: Talbot Hunter
- Captain: Winthrop Kent

The 1914–15 Cornell Big Red men's ice hockey season was the 14th season of play for the program.

== Season ==
Talbot Hunter returned to coach the team after two years away, but the program was hampered by not only a lack of local ice but a dearth of willing competitors. Cornell played the fewest games for the program since 1908 and was only able to win one game against the dying program of Columbia.

== Roster ==
No.	Nat.	Player	Class	Pos	Height	Weight	DoB	Hometown	Previous team
	(United States)	James S. Babbitt	Junior	F			1893-10-13	New York, New York
	(United States)	Marshall R. Barbour	Graduate	F			1891-01-07	Pittsburgh, Pennsylvania
		Alexander M. Beebee	Senior	G			1892-10-17
	(United States)	John P. Harding Jr.	Junior	F				Saranac Lake, New York
		Edward A. Hill	Graduate	F			1891-03-10
	(United States)	Francis T. Hunter	Junior	D			1893-06-24	New Rochelle, New York
	(United States)	Winthrop Kent (C)	Senior	F			1891-03-24	Buffalo, New York
	(United States)	Frederick Spiegelberg Jr.	Junior	F			1895-11-17	New York, New York

== Standings ==
1914–15 Collegiate ice hockey standings
	Intercollegiate							Overall					
	GP	W	L	T	PCT.	GF	GA	GP	W	L	T	GF	GA
Army	3	0	3	0	.000	3	11	5	1	4	0	7	13
Columbia	4	2	2	0	.500	7	16	4	2	2	0	7	16
Cornell	4	1	3	0	.250	11	17	4	1	3	0	11	17
Dartmouth	5	4	1	0	.800	16	10	7	4	3	0	20	17
Harvard	9	8	1	0	.889	49	16	13	9	4	0	51	22
Massachusetts Agricultural	10	5	5	0	.500	32	22	10	5	5	0	32	22
MIT	5	0	5	0	.000	6	20	6	0	6	0	6	28
Princeton	9	4	5	0	.444	17	24	12	6	6	0	28	34
Rensselaer	3	0	3	0	.000	0	14	3	0	3	0	0	14
Trinity	–	–	–	–	–	–	–	–	–	–	–	–	–
Williams	7	4	3	0	.571	14	17	7	4	3	0	14	17
WPI	–	–	–	–	–	–	–	–	–	–	–	–	–
Yale	10	7	3	0	.700	32	21	16	9	7	0	56	43
YMCA College	–	–	–	–	–	–	–	–	–	–	–	–	–

== Schedule and results ==
Date	Opponent	Site	Result	Record
Regular season
December 29	vs. Princeton*	St. Nicholas Rink • New York, New York	L 1–4	0–1–0
January 9	at Harvard*	Boston Arena • Boston, Massachusetts	L 1–8	0–2–0
January 23	at Yale*	New Haven Arena • New Haven, Connecticut	L 2–4	0–3–0
February 5	Columbia*	Beebe Lake • Ithaca, New York	W 7–1	1–3–0
*Non-conference game.
