= 1914–15 Williams Ephs men's ice hockey season =

College ice hockey team season

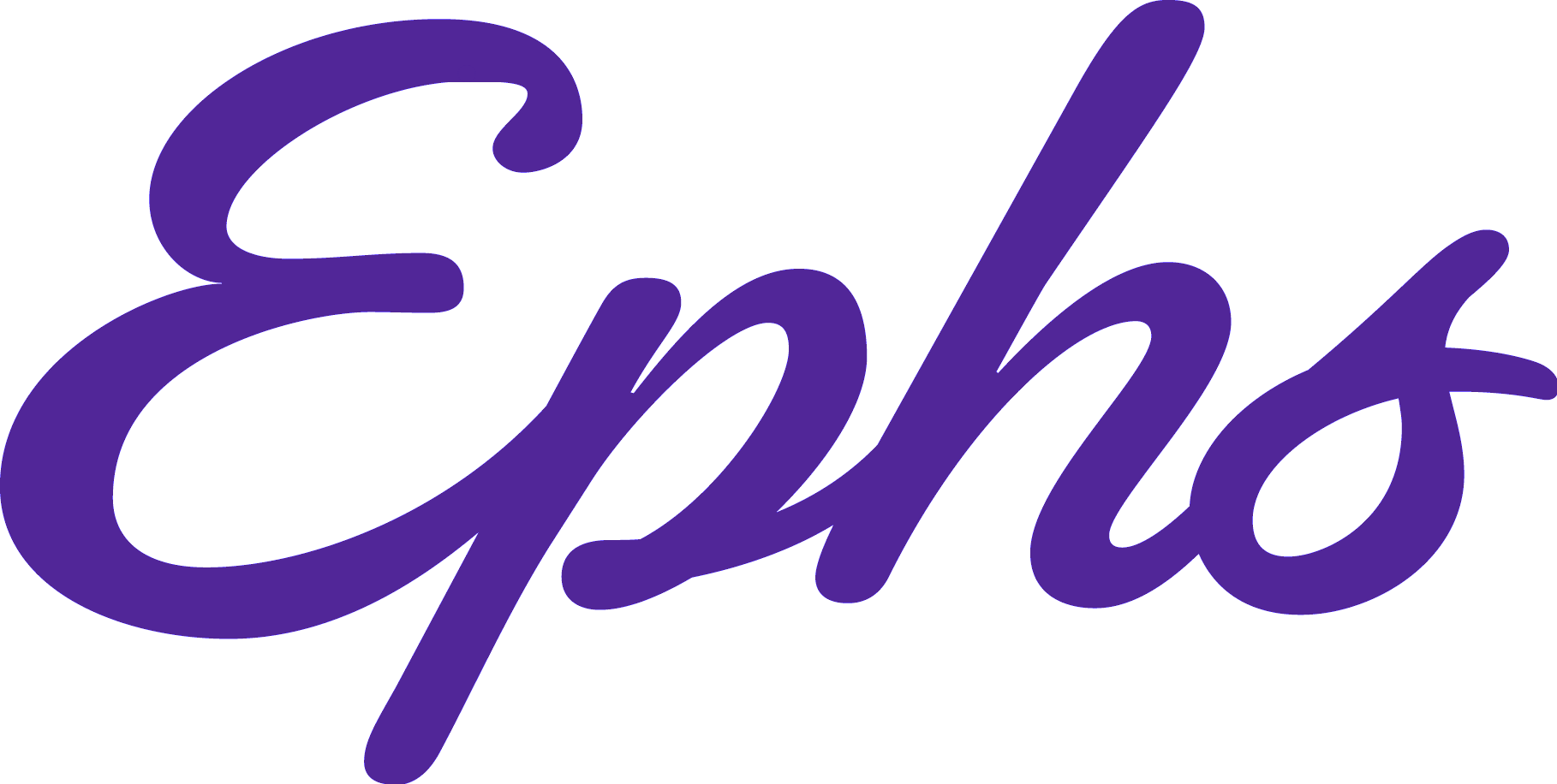
- Home ice: Cole Field House Pond

Record
- Overall: 4–3–0
- Home: 4–0–0
- Road: 0–2–0
- Neutral: 0–1–0

Coaches and captains

The 1914–15 Williams Ephs men's ice hockey season was the 12th season of play for the program.

== Roster ==
No.	Nat.	Player	Class	Pos	Height	Weight	DoB	Hometown	Previous team
		Cole	Senior	G
		Douglas R. Coleman	Junior	LW
		Theodore B. Conklin	Senior	RW
		Conrad F. Cutler	Senior	R
	(United States)	Henry H. Cutler	Junior	C			1892-09-21	Mount Hermon, Massachusetts
	(United States)	Frank A. McNamee Jr.	Senior	D			1892-12-17	Albany, New York
		H. B. Peare		G
		Thomas F. Rochester	Sophomore	LW
		Swain		D

== Standings ==
1914–15 Collegiate ice hockey standings
	Intercollegiate							Overall					
	GP	W	L	T	PCT.	GF	GA	GP	W	L	T	GF	GA
Army	3	0	3	0	.000	3	11	5	1	4	0	7	13
Columbia	4	2	2	0	.500	7	16	4	2	2	0	7	16
Cornell	4	1	3	0	.250	11	17	4	1	3	0	11	17
Dartmouth	5	4	1	0	.800	16	10	7	4	3	0	20	17
Harvard	9	8	1	0	.889	49	16	13	9	4	0	51	22
Massachusetts Agricultural	10	5	5	0	.500	32	22	10	5	5	0	32	22
MIT	5	0	5	0	.000	6	20	6	0	6	0	6	28
Princeton	9	4	5	0	.444	17	24	12	6	6	0	28	34
Rensselaer	3	0	3	0	.000	0	14	3	0	3	0	0	14
Trinity	–	–	–	–	–	–	–	–	–	–	–	–	–
Williams	7	4	3	0	.571	14	17	7	4	3	0	14	17
WPI	–	–	–	–	–	–	–	–	–	–	–	–	–
Yale	10	7	3	0	.700	32	21	16	9	7	0	56	43
YMCA College	–	–	–	–	–	–	–	–	–	–	–	–	–

== Schedule and results ==
Date	Opponent	Site	Result	Record
Regular Season
December 18	Massachusetts Agricultural*	Weston Field Rink • Williamstown, Massachusetts	W 2–0	1–0–0
January 6	at Columbia*	St. Nicholas Rink • New York, New York (Exhibition)	W 6–2	
January 8	at Yale*	New Haven Arena • New Haven, Connecticut	L 2–4	1–1–0
January 9	vs. Princeton*	St. Nicholas Rink • New York, New York	L 1–3	1–2–0
February 9	at Harvard*	Boston Arena • Boston, Massachusetts	L 1–9	1–3–0
February 11	YMCA College*	Weston Field Rink • Williamstown, Massachusetts	W 2–1	2–3–0
February 13	Rensselaer*	Weston Field Rink • Williamstown, Massachusetts	W 3–0	3–3–0
February 20	MIT*	Weston Field Rink • Williamstown, Massachusetts	W 3–0	4–3–0
*Non-conference game.
