= 1914–15 Columbia Lions men's ice hockey season =

- Conference: Independent

Record
- Overall: 2–2–0
- Home: 1–0–0
- Road: 1–2–0

Coaches and captains
- Head coach: Rudolph von Bernuth; Rufus Trimble
- Captain: Torrey Webb

The 1914–15 Columbia Lions men's ice hockey season was the 19th season of play for the program.

== Season ==
Alumni Rudolph Von Bernuth and Rufus Trimble served as coaches for the '15 team. Columbia attempted to construct a home rink for its ice hockey team at 117th and Amsterdam, however the first game against Williams was moved to the St. Nicholas Rink due to soft ice. After being soundly beaten by Mass Ag. the following night, Columbia's next game was against Trinity and was the first scheduled game for the team at the St. Nicholas Rink in three years. Due to the declining attendance figures for Columbia and hockey in general over the previous few years the operators of the rink agreed to give Columbia a test game to try and prove that the team could draw enough support to at least cover the expenses of a game.

Columbia ended the season 2–3 after a win over Army. The Lions were expecting to continue the program the following year, despite not coming to terms with the St. Nicholas Rink. The team attempted to erect another rink on East Field but after the ice melted the first game of the season was cancelled Several more attempts were made to schedule games for the season but warm weather and rain combined to prevent Columbia from playing a single match and the team was shuttered until 1920.

== Roster ==
No.	Nat.	Player	Class	Pos	Height	Weight	DoB	Hometown	Previous team
		Charles Bartow	Junior	RW
		George P. Butler Jr.	Senior
		Eugene Cleary	Freshman	LW
		Kingsley Kunhardt	Freshman
		David L. Meyer	Junior	G
		Louis Mylius	Senior	C
		George R. Page	Senior	D
		Howard Peare	Sophomore
		K. G. Reynolds	Sophomore	D
		Torrey Webb (C)	Junior	R

== Standings ==
1914–15 Collegiate ice hockey standings
	Intercollegiate							Overall					
	GP	W	L	T	PCT.	GF	GA	GP	W	L	T	GF	GA
Army	3	0	3	0	.000	3	11	5	1	4	0	7	13
Columbia	4	2	2	0	.500	7	16	4	2	2	0	7	16
Cornell	4	1	3	0	.250	11	17	4	1	3	0	11	17
Dartmouth	5	4	1	0	.800	16	10	7	4	3	0	20	17
Harvard	9	8	1	0	.889	49	16	13	9	4	0	51	22
Massachusetts Agricultural	10	5	5	0	.500	32	22	10	5	5	0	32	22
MIT	5	0	5	0	.000	6	20	6	0	6	0	6	28
Princeton	9	4	5	0	.444	17	24	12	6	6	0	28	34
Rensselaer	3	0	3	0	.000	0	14	3	0	3	0	0	14
Trinity	–	–	–	–	–	–	–	–	–	–	–	–	–
Williams	7	4	3	0	.571	14	17	7	4	3	0	14	17
WPI	–	–	–	–	–	–	–	–	–	–	–	–	–
Yale	10	7	3	0	.700	32	21	16	9	7	0	56	43
YMCA College	–	–	–	–	–	–	–	–	–	–	–	–	–

== Schedule and results ==
Date	Opponent	Site	Result	Record
Regular Season
January 6	Williams*	St. Nicholas Rink • New York, New York (Exhibition)	L 2–6	
January 7	vs. Massachusetts Agricultural*	New Haven Arena • New Haven, Connecticut	L 0–5	0–1–0
January 18	vs. Trinity*	St. Nicholas Rink • New York, New York	W 4–3	1–1–0
February 5	at Cornell*	Beebe Lake • Ithaca, New York	L 1–7	1–2–0
February 10	at Army*	Stuart Rink • West Point, New York	W 2–1	2–2–0
*Non-conference game.
