= 1914–15 MIT Engineers men's ice hockey season =

- Conference: Independent
- Home ice: Boston Arena

Record
- Overall: 0–6–0
- Road: 0–5–0
- Neutral: 0–1–0

Coaches and captains
- Head coach: Harry Denesha
- Captain: Ralph Fletcher

The 1914–15 MIT Engineers men's ice hockey season was the 16th season of play for the program.

== Season ==
Harry Denesha was the a head coach and Nelson MacRae served as team manager.

Note: Massachusetts Institute of Technology athletics were referred to as 'Engineers' or 'Techmen' during the first two decades of the 20th century. By 1920 all sports programs had adopted the Engineer moniker.

== Roster ==
No.	Nat.	Player	Class	Pos	Height	Weight	DoB	Hometown	Previous team
		Clarence Cochrane	Sophomore	R
	(United States)	Raymond S. Coward	Freshman	LW			1895-06-08	Cambridge, Massachusetts
		Ralph L. Fletcher (C)	Senior	RW
	(United States)	Prescott W. Gould	Sophomore	D			1894-02-23	Newton Upper Falls, Massachusetts
		Gardner E. Johnson	Freshman	G			1895-03-02
	(United States)	Harold Y. Keeler	Sophomore				1896-04-19	Ridgefield, Connecticut
		Kenneth B. Toye	Sophomore
	(United States)	Chester R. Tutein	Freshman				1895-05-17	Revere, Massachusetts
		Clifford D. Winton	Sophomore	C
	(United States)	John B. Woodward	Freshman	D			1892-04-18	Albany, New York

== Standings ==
1914–15 Collegiate ice hockey standings
	Intercollegiate							Overall					
	GP	W	L	T	PCT.	GF	GA	GP	W	L	T	GF	GA
Army	3	0	3	0	.000	3	11	5	1	4	0	7	13
Columbia	4	2	2	0	.500	7	16	4	2	2	0	7	16
Cornell	4	1	3	0	.250	11	17	4	1	3	0	11	17
Dartmouth	5	4	1	0	.800	16	10	7	4	3	0	20	17
Harvard	9	8	1	0	.889	49	16	13	9	4	0	51	22
Massachusetts Agricultural	10	5	5	0	.500	32	22	10	5	5	0	32	22
MIT	5	0	5	0	.000	6	20	6	0	6	0	6	28
Princeton	9	4	5	0	.444	17	24	12	6	6	0	28	34
Rensselaer	3	0	3	0	.000	0	14	3	0	3	0	0	14
Trinity	–	–	–	–	–	–	–	–	–	–	–	–	–
Williams	7	4	3	0	.571	14	17	7	4	3	0	14	17
WPI	–	–	–	–	–	–	–	–	–	–	–	–	–
Yale	10	7	3	0	.700	32	21	16	9	7	0	56	43
YMCA College	–	–	–	–	–	–	–	–	–	–	–	–	–

== Schedule and results ==
Date	Opponent	Site	Result	Record
Regular Season
December 16	vs. Harvard*	Boston Arena • Boston, Massachusetts	L 2–6	0–1–0
January 13	at Yale*	New Haven Arena • New Haven, Connecticut	L 3–5	0–2–0
January 16	at Massachusetts Agricultural*	MAC Campus Pond • Amherst, Massachusetts	L 0–2	0–3–0
February 3	at New Haven Arena Team*	New Haven Arena • New Haven, Connecticut	L 0–8	0–4–0
February 4	at Dartmouth*	Occom Pond • Hanover, New Hampshire	L 1–4	0–5–0
February 20	at Williams*	Weston Field Rink • Williamstown, Massachusetts	L 0–3	0–6–0
*Non-conference game.
