= Ruth Denesha =

Pioneer in women's hockey; founder of women's hockey in Boston

Personal information
- Born: March 19, 1894 Ontario, Canada
- Died: January 15, 1973 (aged 78) Ogdensburg, New York, U.S.
- Home town: Morrisburg, Ontario, Canada
- Occupations: Ice hockey player, educator

Sport
- Sport: Ice hockey
- Position: Rover
- Team: Boston Girls' Hockey Team

Ruth Evelyn Denesha (March 19, 1894 – January 15, 1973) was a Canadian-born American ice hockey player and a pioneer in women's ice hockey in the United States. She was a co-founder and the captain of the Boston Girls' Hockey Team, one of the first documented intercity women's ice hockey teams in the United States and the first in Boston. She is considered a pioneer in women's ice hockey in the United States.

== Early life ==
Denesha was born in 1894 in Ontario, Canada to American-born parents, Captain William A. Denesha and Hattie M. Denesha (née Starke). She had two older brothers: Harry Russell Denesha and Douglas A. Denesha. Denesha's father died in November 1899 following an accident on his tugboat, the Ruth. Denesha spent her childhood in Morrisburg, Ontario.

Denesha immigrated from Canada to Cambridge, Massachusetts in 1912 at age 18 to attend the Sargent School of Physical Training, now part of Boston University. She graduated from the Sargent School in 1915, and continued working at the school as an assistant in general gymnastics, athletics and swimming, and heavy apparatus work.

== Ice hockey ==
=== Boston Girls' Hockey Team ===
In 1916, Denesha co-founded the Boston Girls' Hockey Team at the Boston Arena with her future teammate, Gertrude Hawkes. This team was the first intercity women's hockey team in Boston and among the first in the country. Denesha captained the team, with her older brother, Harry Denesha, volunteering as coach. Harry had previously been a hockey player for the New York Athletic Club and would go on to coach men's hockey at Dartmouth College.

Denesha ran tryouts for the team on December 30, 1916, with advertisements for tryouts reaching as far as Cleveland. The team played both men's teams and other city's women's teams, and was described as "the best of its kind in New England" by the Cincinnati Enquirer.

Denesha played rover and scored two of Boston's three goals in the team's first intercity game against the New York's St. Nicholas Blues in Boston. The Montreal Star also reported that Denesha lost two teeth in this game. While the team lost the next two away games in New York, Denesha remained a strong player.

=== Legacy ===
Denesha is known as the founder and first captain of Boston's first women's intercity hockey team. As the star player in one of the first women's hockey games in the United States, she is considered one of the first elite hockey players in this country.

== Personal life ==
Denesha continued to work in physical education and as a health education teacher following her ice hockey career. She renounced her Canadian citizenship and became a naturalized citizen of the United States on June 18, 1926 in Detroit.

On August 17, 1933, Denesha married William Forsythe in Waddington, New York. At the time of their marriage, Denesha was 39 years old and Forsythe, a civil engineer, was 40 years old. The couple had one daughter, Ruth S. Forsythe, born in 1936.

Denesha died on January 15, 1973, aged 78, at A. Barton Hepburn Hospital in Ogdensburg, New York and was buried at Brookside Cemetery in Waddington.
