= 1914–15 Massachusetts Agricultural Aggies men's ice hockey season =

- Home ice: Campus Pond

Record
- Overall: 5–5–0
- Home: 2–0–0
- Road: 2–4–0
- Neutral: 1–1–0

Coaches and captains
- Captain: Herbert Archibald

The 1914–15 Massachusetts Agricultural Aggies men's ice hockey season was the 7th season of play for the program.

== Roster ==
No.	Nat.	Player	Class	Pos	Height	Weight	DoB	Hometown	Previous team
		Herbert H. Archibald (C)	Senior
		David H. Buttrick	Sophomore	G
		Ray L. Chisholm	Junior
		Charles H. Fernald II	Junior
		Arthur Johnson	Senior
	(United States)	Louis W. Ross	Sophomore				1893-07-18	Arlington, Massachusetts
	(United States)	Carrick E. Wildon	Junior				1893-12-09	Everett, Massachusetts
		Harold C. Woolley	Junior

== Standings ==
1914–15 Collegiate ice hockey standings
	Intercollegiate							Overall					
	GP	W	L	T	PCT.	GF	GA	GP	W	L	T	GF	GA
Army	3	0	3	0	.000	3	11	5	1	4	0	7	13
Columbia	4	2	2	0	.500	7	16	4	2	2	0	7	16
Cornell	4	1	3	0	.250	11	17	4	1	3	0	11	17
Dartmouth	5	4	1	0	.800	16	10	7	4	3	0	20	17
Harvard	9	8	1	0	.889	49	16	13	9	4	0	51	22
Massachusetts Agricultural	10	5	5	0	.500	32	22	10	5	5	0	32	22
MIT	5	0	5	0	.000	6	20	6	0	6	0	6	28
Princeton	9	4	5	0	.444	17	24	12	6	6	0	28	34
Rensselaer	3	0	3	0	.000	0	14	3	0	3	0	0	14
Trinity	–	–	–	–	–	–	–	–	–	–	–	–	–
Williams	7	4	3	0	.571	14	17	7	4	3	0	14	17
WPI	–	–	–	–	–	–	–	–	–	–	–	–	–
Yale	10	7	3	0	.700	32	21	16	9	7	0	56	43
YMCA College	–	–	–	–	–	–	–	–	–	–	–	–	–

== Schedule and results ==
Date	Opponent	Site	Result	Record
Regular Season
December 18	at Williams*	Weston Field Rink • Williamstown, Massachusetts	L 0–2	0–1–0
December 19	at Rensselaer*	RPI Rink • Troy, New York	W 8–0	1–1–0
December 31	vs. Dartmouth*	Boston Arena • Boston, Massachusetts	L 2–4	1–2–0
January 4	vs. Princeton*	Boston Arena • Boston, Massachusetts	L 2–3	1–3–0
January 6	at Yale*	New Haven Arena • New Haven, Connecticut	L 2–5	1–4–0
January 7	vs. Columbia*	New Haven Arena • New Haven, Connecticut	W 5–0	2–4–0
January 9	at Army*	Stuart Rink • West Point, New York	W 7–1	3–4–0
January 16	MIT*	Pratt Field Rink • Amherst, Massachusetts	W 2–0	4–4–0
January 30	YMCA College*	Campus Pond • Amherst, Massachusetts	W 4–3	5–4–0
February 3	at Harvard*	Boston Arena • Boston, Massachusetts	L 0–4	5–5–0
*Non-conference game.
