= 1914–15 Yale Bulldogs men's ice hockey season =

College ice hockey season

- Conference: 2nd IHL
- Home ice: New Haven Arena

Record
- Overall: 9–7–0
- Conference: 2–3–0
- Home: 5–3–0
- Road: 0–2–0
- Neutral: 4–2–0

Coaches and captains
- Captain: William Sweney

The 1914–15 Yale Bulldogs men's ice hockey season was the 20th season of play for the program.

== Season ==
Before the season began Yale abandoned its plan to build an on-campus skating arena. They did so because the university was able to reach an agreement with the newly opened New Haven Arena and the Yale men's team possessed its first permanent home venue. They played their first game at the arena on December 16 against the New Haven Hockey Club, losing a disjointed game 1–4.

The team played twice over the winter break, with its full regular lineup, and broke even in the matches at the St. Nicholas Rink. When the Elis played their next home game the team had rounded into form and played a strong game against the Aggies, winning their first intercollegiate game of the year. Yale continued to beat up on the smaller colleges, winning twice more before heading to Canada for a match against Toronto. The Bulldogs played poorly in the first half, surrendering 3 goals to the Blues but recovered their game in the second. The team outplayed Toronto but couldn't overcome the sizable lead and returned to the States after a 2–3 loss.

Yale won one more game before their showdown against defending champion Princeton. The Tigers, however, were missing much of the previous year's offense and the Elis were able to hold Princeton to a single goal in a 3–1 win. A few days later the team was in Boston for a game against Harvard. The Crimson goaltender Wylie was the star of the game, turning aside many good shots for a 4–2 win over the Elis.

The Elis continued to burnish their record with wins over McGill and Dartmouth. They lost a close match to the St. Nicholas Hockey Club due to the incessant attack led by Hobey Baker. A few days later the team faced Baker's alma mater in a rematch. Despite their reduced offense, Princeton was able to restrict Yale to a single goal and captured the game in overtime, necessitating a third game three days later.

The rubber match was another tight checking battle with both defenses playing well. It was Yale's defense that held throughout the game, however, and the three goals from the Elis allowed them to win the game and capture the first series for the team since they had begun three years earlier. The rematch with Harvard happened just three days later and with the IHL series on the line the Elis had no margin for error. Yale played a tremendous game, outshooting Harvard 24 to 13, but the Harvard netminder was again the hero and Harvard skated away with the 3–1 win, along with a series victory and the Intercollegiate Championship.

Thomas Connors served as team manager.

== Roster ==
No.	Nat.	Player	Class	Pos	Height	Weight	DoB	Hometown	Previous team
		John E. Bierwirth	Sophomore	D	5' 10" (1.78 m)	165 lb (75 kg)			Hotchkiss School
	(United States)	Douglas G. Buchanan	Junior	LW			1892-05-08	Pittsburgh, Pennsylvania
	(United States)	Frederick V. Burgess	Junior	C	5' 8" (1.73 m)	155 lb (70 kg)	1892-09-11	Burlington, Vermont	St. Paul's School
	(United States)	Charles D. Dickey	Junior	F	5' 10" (1.78 m)	155 lb (70 kg)	1893-12-03	New York, New York	St. Paul's School
	(United States)	Marshall R. Herron	Senior	D	5' 8" (1.73 m)	150 lb (68 kg)	1891-04-06	Chicago, Illinois	Hotchkiss School
		Kent		LW
	(United States)	Ranald H. MacDonald Jr.	Senior	C/RW	5' 7" (1.7 m)	148 lb (67 kg)	1891-11-24	Brooklyn, New York	St. Paul's School
		Lawrence N. Murray	Sophomore	C/LW					St. Paul's School
		Morgan B. Schiller	Graduate	G	5' 10" (1.78 m)	150 lb (68 kg)	1893-07-23		St. Paul's School
	(United States)	William H. Sweney	Senior	R	5' 10" (1.78 m)	155 lb (70 kg)	1893-05-09	St. Louis, Missouri	Hotchkiss School
		Harold Wilson	Junior	R/C/RW	5' 11" (1.8 m)	150 lb (68 kg)			Hackley School
	(Canada)	Henry J. Wiser	Senior	C/LW			1893-09-18	Prescott, Ontario
	(United States)	Holcomb York	Sophomore	G	5' 10" (1.78 m)	160 lb (73 kg)	1895-05-04	New Haven, Connecticut	Hotchkiss School

== Standings ==
1914–15 Collegiate ice hockey standings
	Intercollegiate							Overall					
	GP	W	L	T	PCT.	GF	GA	GP	W	L	T	GF	GA
Army	3	0	3	0	.000	3	11	5	1	4	0	7	13
Columbia	4	2	2	0	.500	7	16	4	2	2	0	7	16
Cornell	4	1	3	0	.250	11	17	4	1	3	0	11	17
Dartmouth	5	4	1	0	.800	16	10	7	4	3	0	20	17
Harvard	9	8	1	0	.889	49	16	13	9	4	0	51	22
Massachusetts Agricultural	10	5	5	0	.500	32	22	10	5	5	0	32	22
MIT	5	0	5	0	.000	6	20	6	0	6	0	6	28
Princeton	9	4	5	0	.444	17	24	12	6	6	0	28	34
Rensselaer	3	0	3	0	.000	0	14	3	0	3	0	0	14
Trinity	–	–	–	–	–	–	–	–	–	–	–	–	–
Williams	7	4	3	0	.571	14	17	7	4	3	0	14	17
WPI	–	–	–	–	–	–	–	–	–	–	–	–	–
Yale	10	7	3	0	.700	32	21	16	9	7	0	56	43
YMCA College	–	–	–	–	–	–	–	–	–	–	–	–	–

1914–15 Intercollegiate Hockey League standings
	Conference								Overall					
	GP	W	L	T	PTS	SW	GF	GA	GP	W	L	T	GF	GA
Harvard *	4	4	0	0	1.000	2	16	5	13	9	4	0	51	22
Yale	5	2	3	0	.400	1	10	11	16	9	7	0	56	43
Princeton	5	1	4	0	.200	0	6	16	12	6	6	0	28	34
* indicates conference champion

== Schedule and results ==
Date	Opponent	Site	Result	Record
Regular season
December 16	vs. New Haven Hockey Club*	New Haven Arena • New Haven, Connecticut	L 1–4	0–1–0
December 19	vs. Crescent Athletic Club*	St. Nicholas Rink • New York, New York	L 5–6	0–2–0
December 22	vs. St. Paul's School*	St. Nicholas Rink • New York, New York	W 6–2	1–2–0
January 6	Massachusetts Agricultural*	New Haven Arena • New Haven, Connecticut	W 5–2	2–2–0
January 8	Williams*	New Haven Arena • New Haven, Connecticut	W 4–2	3–2–0
January 13	MIT*	New Haven Arena • New Haven, Connecticut	W 5–3	4–2–0
January 16	at Toronto*	Toronto, Ontario	L 2–3	4–3–0
January 23	Cornell*	New Haven Arena • New Haven, Connecticut	W 4–2	5–3–0
January 27	vs. Princeton	St. Nicholas Rink • New York, New York	W 3–1	6–3–0 (1–0–0)
January 30	at Harvard	Boston Arena • Boston, Massachusetts (Rivalry)	L 2–4	6–4–0 (1–1–0)
February 6	vs. McGill*	St. Nicholas Rink • New York, New York	W 7–3	7–4–0
February 8	Dartmouth*	New Haven Arena • New Haven, Connecticut	W 4–1	8–4–0
February 13	St. Nicholas Hockey Club*	New Haven Arena • New Haven, Connecticut	L 3–4	8–5–0
February 17	Princeton	New Haven Arena • New Haven, Connecticut	L 1–2 ^{OT}	8–6–0 (1–2–0)
February 20	vs. Princeton	St. Nicholas Rink • New York, New York	W 3–1	9–6–0 (2–2–0)
February 23	Harvard	New Haven Arena • New Haven, Connecticut (Rivalry)	L 1–3	9–7–0 (2–3–0)
*Non-conference game.
