= 1914–15 Princeton Tigers men's ice hockey season =

College ice hockey season

- Conference: 3rd IHL
- Home ice: Lake Carnegie

Record
- Overall: 6–6–0
- Conference: 1–4–0
- Road: 1–3–0
- Neutral: 5–3–0

Coaches and captains
- Head coach: Clarence Peacock
- Assistant coaches: Hobey Baker; Thornton Emmons; Ehrick Kilner; Frank Winants
- Captain: Grant Peacock

The 1914–15 Princeton Tigers men's ice hockey season was the 16th season of play for the program.

== Season ==
After winning their third championship in five seasons, and with the departure of the best play the program has ever seen, Princeton was expected to take a step back after seeing many of its starters graduate in 1914. Gus Hornfeck was replaced as coach by former assistant and captain of the '10 team, Clarence Peacock with several players from the previous year's squad serving as assistants. After several days of practice the final cuts produced a varsity team that had few returning players.

Princeton began their season well, winning three of four to start with only Boston Athletic Association able to stop the Tigers. Despite the wins there was concern for the team after it was barely able to defeat Mass Ag. Regardless of the worries, Princeton went 2–1 over the following week as the team geared up for the championship series with Harvard and Yale.

Princeton produced a paltry effort against the Crimson, losing 1–4. After a week off there was no improvement to their game as Harvard won the rematch 5–1. Princeton was heading for a terrible end to their season after a loss in the first match with Yale but the team recovered for the second contest, holding the Elis to a single goal with captain Grant Peacock scored both goals in a double overtime win. While they couldn't sustain the level of play, losing the rubber match to Yale, Princeton's win against the Bulldogs did provide hope for the future of the young team.

After the season John Humphreys was named as a first-team all-collegian.

== Roster ==
| No. | Nat. | Player | Class | Pos | Height | Weight | DoB | Hometown | Previous team |
|---|---|---|---|---|---|---|---|---|---|
| | | William Clarkson | Sophomore | RW |
| | | Henry Cohu | Sophomore | G |
| | | Harold Comey | Sophomore | RW |
| | | Robert Cowan | Junior | RW |
| | | Henry W. Ford | Sophomore | G |
| | | Charles Garrison | Junior | D |
| | | Paul W. Hills | Sophomore | LW |
| | | Jesse Hoyt | Junior | W |
| | | John Humphreys | Sophomore | D |
| | | William Humphreys | Sophomore | R |
| | | Grant Peacock (C) | Junior | D/C |
| | | William Schoen | Sophomore | RW |
| | | John Scully | Sophomore | RW |

== Standings ==
1914–15 Collegiate ice hockey standings
| | Intercollegiate | | | | | | | Overall | | | | | |
| | GP | W | L | T | PCT. | GF | GA | GP | W | L | T | GF | GA |
|---|---|---|---|---|---|---|---|---|---|---|---|---|---|
| Army | 3 | 0 | 3 | 0 | .000 | 3 | 11 | 5 | 1 | 4 | 0 | 7 | 13 |
| Columbia | 4 | 2 | 2 | 0 | .500 | 7 | 16 | 4 | 2 | 2 | 0 | 7 | 16 |
| Cornell | 4 | 1 | 3 | 0 | .250 | 11 | 17 | 4 | 1 | 3 | 0 | 11 | 17 |
| Dartmouth | 5 | 4 | 1 | 0 | .800 | 16 | 10 | 7 | 4 | 3 | 0 | 20 | 17 |
| Harvard | 9 | 8 | 1 | 0 | .889 | 49 | 16 | 13 | 9 | 4 | 0 | 51 | 22 |
| Massachusetts Agricultural | 10 | 5 | 5 | 0 | .500 | 32 | 22 | 10 | 5 | 5 | 0 | 32 | 22 |
| MIT | 5 | 0 | 5 | 0 | .000 | 6 | 20 | 6 | 0 | 6 | 0 | 6 | 28 |
| Princeton | 9 | 4 | 5 | 0 | .444 | 17 | 24 | 12 | 6 | 6 | 0 | 28 | 34 |
| Rensselaer | 3 | 0 | 3 | 0 | .000 | 0 | 14 | 3 | 0 | 3 | 0 | 0 | 14 |
| Trinity | – | – | – | – | – | – | – | – | – | – | – | – | – |
| Williams | 7 | 4 | 3 | 0 | .571 | 14 | 17 | 7 | 4 | 3 | 0 | 14 | 17 |
| WPI | – | – | – | – | – | – | – | – | – | – | – | – | – |
| Yale | 10 | 7 | 3 | 0 | .700 | 32 | 21 | 16 | 9 | 7 | 0 | 56 | 43 |
| YMCA College | – | – | – | – | – | – | – | – | – | – | – | – | – |

1914–15 Intercollegiate Hockey League standings
| | Conference | | | | | | | | Overall | | | | | |
| | GP | W | L | T | PTS | SW | GF | GA | GP | W | L | T | GF | GA |
|---|---|---|---|---|---|---|---|---|---|---|---|---|---|---|
| Harvard * | 4 | 4 | 0 | 0 | 1.000 | 2 | 16 | 5 | 13 | 9 | 4 | 0 | 51 | 22 |
| Yale | 5 | 2 | 3 | 0 | .400 | 1 | 10 | 11 | 16 | 9 | 7 | 0 | 56 | 43 |
| Princeton | 5 | 1 | 4 | 0 | .200 | 0 | 6 | 16 | 12 | 6 | 6 | 0 | 28 | 34 |
* indicates conference champion

== Schedule and results ==
| Date | Opponent | Site | Result | Record |
Regular Season
| December 23 | vs. Irish American Athletic Club* | St. Nicholas Rink • New York, New York | W 5–2 | 1–0–0 |
| December 29 | vs. Cornell* | St. Nicholas Rink • New York, New York | W 4–1 | 2–0–0 |
| January 2 | at Boston Athletic Association* | Boston Arena • Boston, Massachusetts | L 1–4 | 2–1–0 |
| January 4 | vs. Massachusetts Agricultural* | Boston Arena • Boston, Massachusetts | W 3–2 | 3–1–0 |
| January 9 | vs. Williams* | St. Nicholas Rink • New York, New York | W 3–1 | 4–1–0 |
| January 13 | vs. Dartmouth* | Boston Arena • Boston, Massachusetts | L 1–4 | 4–2–0 |
| January 16 | vs. Harvard | St. Nicholas Rink • New York, New York | L 1–4 | 4–3–0 (0–1–0) |
| January 23 | at Harvard | Boston Arena • Boston, Massachusetts | L 1–5 | 4–4–0 (0–2–0) |
| January 27 | at Yale | St. Nicholas Rink • New York, New York | L 1–3 | 4–5–0 (0–3–0) |
| February 17 | vs. Yale | St. Nicholas Rink • New York, New York | W 2–1 ^{2OT} | 5–5–0 (1–3–0) |
| February 20 | vs. Yale | St. Nicholas Rink • New York, New York | L 1–3 | 5–6–0 (1–4–0) |
| February 22 | at St. Paul's School* | Concord, New Hampshire | W 5–4 | 6–6–0 |
*Non-conference game.
