= History of women's ice hockey in the United States =

Aspect of women's history

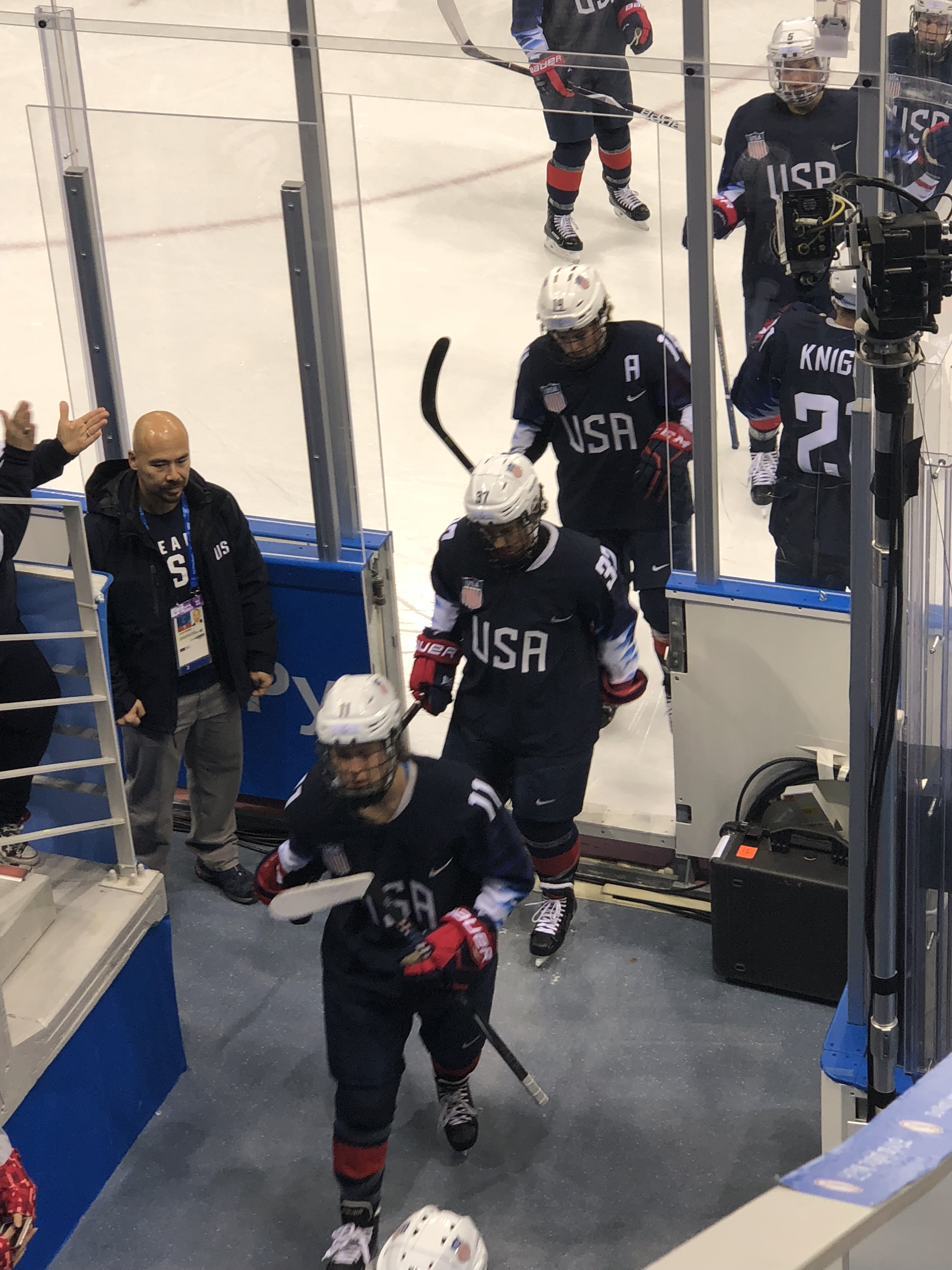
Gold-medalist USA Women's Hockey at the 2018 Pyeongchang Winter Olympics

The history of women's ice hockey in the United States can be traced back to as early as the late nineteenth century, although more serious, structured teams were not formed until the late 1910s.

== Early History ==
=== The Era of "First Starts" (Pre-1915) ===
Dr. Andrew Holman, professor of history at Bridgewater State University, has described the period of women's hockey in the United States prior to 1916 as "the era of 'first starts'". Given the dates many hockey teams were established in the United States (see "Structured Hockey Begins" below), in this article, the time has been amended to pre-1915. There is evidence of women playing hockey as early as the 1890s, for instance:

- 1896 - Students at Mount Holyoke College, an all women's school, are photographed skating with ice hockey sticks in the newly erected John D. Rockefeller Skating Rink.
- 1899 - A women's ice hockey match between Ottawa and Philadelphia is reported on in the Ottawa Citizen.
- 1907 - A photograph displays the Hens, a women's ice hockey team formed in Hannah, North Dakota,who played against men's teams.
- 1909 - The Star Tribune reports that the Minnesota Amazons, a team made up of women from Macalester College in St. Paul and elsewhere, planned to play women and men's teams.

=== Structured Hockey Begins (1915 - 1922) ===
Women's hockey became more structured and organized during and in the years after World War I. Cities with confirmed women's teams included Boston, New York, Pittsburgh, Philadelphia, San Francisco, and Seattle. There is also evidence that Cleveland, Syracuse, and Maine may have had women's teams. The table below shows a list of women's hockey teams between 1915 and 1922. This list is likely non-exhaustive, as many teams did not have formal names or were not written about in newspapers.

Consistent with other early 20th century hockey, teams generally had seven players on the ice: a goaltender, two on defense, three forwards, and one rover.

List of Women's Hockey Teams 1915-1922
Team	City	Years active (Approx.)	Home Rink
Polar Maids	Pittsburgh, PA	1915–1917	Duquesne Garden Ice Palace
Arctic Girls	Pittsburgh, PA	1915–1917	Duquesne Garden Ice Palace
Winter Garden Girls	Pittsburgh, PA	1916–1917	Winter Garden Rink
St. Nicholas Blues	Brooklyn, NY	1916–1921	St. Nicholas Rink
Boston Girls' Hockey Club	Boston, MA	1916–1918	Boston Arena
Minerva Hockey Club	Oakland, CA	1916–1918	Techau Tavern Ice Palace
Diana Club	San Francisco, CA	1916–1918	Techau Tavern Ice Palace
Princess Pats	San Francisco, CA	1917–1919	Techau Tavern Ice Palace
Wanderers	San Francisco, CA	1917–1919	Techau Tavern Ice Palace
Seattle Hockeyettes	Seattle, WA	1917–1918	Seattle Ice Arena
Seattle Metettes	Seattle, WA	1917–1918	Seattle Ice Arena
Glacier Girls	Seattle, WA	1917–1918	Seattle Ice Arena
Manhattan Reds	New York, NY	1916–1917	St. Nicholas Rink
Seattle Vamps	Seattle, WA	1920–1921	
Sticks (later referred to as "Debs" short for Debutantes)	St. Louis, MO	1920–1921	St. Louis Winter Garden St. Louis Ice Palace
Clubs (later referred to as "Debs" short for Debutantes)	St. Louis, MO	1920–1921	St. Louis Winter Garden St. Louis Ice Palace
Washington University Inter-Sorority Team	St. Louis, MO	1921	
University of Washington Women's Team	Seattle, WA	1920–1921	
Back Bay Hockey Club	Boston, MA	1920–1921	Boston Arena
Girls' A.A.	Boston, MA	1921	
Thorns	Philadelphia, PA	1920–1921	Philadelphia Ice Palace
Roses	Philadelphia, PA	1920–1921	Philadelphia Ice Palace
Philadelphia Cricket Club	Philadelphia, PA	1920–1921	
Merion Cricket Club	Philadelphia, PA	1920–1921	
Quaker City Maids (Philadelphia all-star team)	Philadelphia, PA	1920–1921	Philadelphia Ice Palace
University of Minnesota "Reds" v. "Greens" (1916–1917) Freshman v. Sophomore v. Junior v. Senior (1917–1930)	Minneapolis, MN	1915–1930	Outdoor rink behind the Armory (1915–1920) Northrop Field rink (1921–1930)
Carleton College "Maize" v. "Blue"	Northfield, MN	1921–1922	Lyman Lakes

==== Overview of Select Early Teams by City ====
===== Boston =====
Tryouts for the Boston Girls' Hockey Team were held in late 1916, with try-out advertisements reaching as far as Cleveland. According to the Boston Globe, the first practice and first round of tryouts, were held at the Boston Arena on Friday, December 30, 1916, with fourteen women in attendance: Ruth Denesha, Gertrude Hawkes, Agnes Seamans, Lina Bowen, Agnes Seamans, Mary Campbell, Katherine McDougall, Mildred Copley, Helen Sheehan, Betty Hawkes, Marjorie Olsen, Esther Carr, Elsie Butler, Lena Doucette, and Frances Goldberg. The same article noted that Ruth Denesha and Gertrude Hawkes were responsible for forming the team. Denesha's brother, Harry Denesha, served as a volunteer coach, and Mary Hawkes, a relative of Gertrude Hawkes, agreed to chaperone the women for out of town games and serve as manager. While the game schedule was not set at the time of tryouts, women's hockey clubs in New York, Syracuse, Cleveland, Pittsburgh, Maine, and Canada were noted as potential competitors.

The Boston Girls' Hockey Team dissolved by the end of 1918, likely due to a fire that destroyed the original Boston Arena in December 1918. When the arena re-opened in early 2021, the team reformed, now branded as the "Back Bay Hockey Club." In a December 1920 article, the Boston Daily Globe stated the team was to be led by Dorothea M. O'Donoghue, a goaltender who "weighs only 115 pounds and is only 5 feel 2 inches tall. She has grit, however, and the muscle, for she says she is as strong as many men who weighs twice as much as she." The article additionally stated that many of the original Boston Girls' Hockey Team players would return, including Gertrude Hawkes (now as player and manager), Agnes Seamens, Mary Campbell, Helen Sheehan, and Dorothea O'Donoghue. The new coach was to be a "Coach Myers, now with Boston University." Concurrently, an attempt was also being made in Boston to form women hockey teams at Boston University, the Posse Normal School of Gymnastics in Boston, and the Sargent Gymnasium in Cambridge. Later in 1921, a second women's team in Boston, Girls A. A., was formed.

Notable players of this era in Boston included:

- Ruth Denesha - Co-founder and captain of the Boston Girls' Hockey Team.
- Gertrude Hawkes - Co-founder of the Boston Girls' Hockey Team. Later manager of the Back Bay Hockey Club.
- Agnes Seamans - From Somerville, MA. Also accomplished runner and holder of the mil women's championship of New England. Player on Boston Girl's Hockey Team and Back Bay Hockey Club.
- Helen Sheehan - From Natick, MA. Also played basketball at Boston University. Player on Boston Girl's Hockey Team and Back Bay Hockey Club.
- Mildred Conley - Wife of Farrell "Pop" Conley, a male hockey player on the Arena Hockey Club of Boston.
- Lina Bowen - From Belmont, MA.
- Dorothea O'Donoghue - Goaltender. Captain of the Back Bay Hockey Club.
- Mary Campbell - Player on Boston Girl's Hockey Team and Back Bay Hockey Club.
- Frances Goldburg
- Lena Doucette
- Katherine McDougal

===== New York City =====
The St. Nicholas Blues were initially organized by Kathleen Howard in 1916. Howard initially moved to New York City from Winnipeg with her husband, Tom Howard, after he accepted a job coaching Yale and Columbia's hockey teams and playing for the New York Athletic Club. Tom Howard had previously won a Stanley Cub wit the Winnipeg Victorias.

The earliest record of a structured game in New York City was in 1916, when the New York Times reported that the St. Nicholas Blues played the Manhattan Reds at St. Nicholas Rink on November 16. The game tied 1:1, with Hallie Twombly scoring for the Blues, and Elsie Muller scoring for the Reds.

Notable players of this era in New York City included:

- Elsie Muller - Played for the Manhattan Reds in the inaugural St. Nicholas Blues - Manhattan Reds game. Later, captain for the St. Nicholas Blues. Represented the United States in speedskating at the 1932 Winter Olympics. She was inducted into the National Speedskating Hall of Fame on May 18, 1968.
- Hallie Twombly - Described as "a miss who was able to out-skate and outskirmish most of the girls on the ice" in the inaugural St. Nicholas Blues - Manhattan Reds game.

===== Seattle =====
The Seattle Vamps, also occasionally referred to as the Seattle Sweeties, were a women's ice hockey team based in Seattle that competed in the 1921 International Ladies' Hockey League season, the world's first women's tournament of the sport to include entrants from multiple nations.

In February 1921, Frank Patrick announced a women's international championship series that would be played in conjunction with the Pacific Coast Hockey Association. The three teams that competed were the Vancouver Amazons, Victoria Kewpies, and Seattle Vamps. On February 21, 1921, the Seattle Vamps competed against the Vancouver Amazons in Vancouver, and were vanquished by a 5–0 score. Two days later, the Vamps played against a team from the University of British Columbia and won the game. Jerry Reed scored three goals (a hat trick) in the game for the Vamps. In both games, the Vancouver media referred to the Seattle team as the Seattle Sweeties. The Amazons traveled to Seattle and defeated them again. On March 2, 1921, the Vamps were defeated by the Kewpies 1–0 in Seattle. In the rematch on March 12, the Vamps travelled to Victoria. The result was a 1–1 tie, and Jerry Reed scored the goal for Seattle. The goaltender for the Vamps was Mildren Terran. After the 1921 season, the Vamps and the Kewpies ceased operations.

=== The Quiet Decades (1922 - 1963) ===
Hockey and other women's sports declined in the 1920s and for the next several decades for a multitude of reasons, including the belief that sports made women "competitive, masculine, and unbecoming" and the belief that women's sports would never be profitable. These reasons may have been further compounded by the Great Depression and World War II, which led to rink closures and reduced programming.

In 1923, the National Amateur Athletic Federation (NAAF) was created to coordinate and regulate amateur sports in the United States. While the federation's Women's Division did promote women playing sports, it urged that they must "play for play's sake," meaning women should not play competitively. Consequently, there was a decrease in women's collegiate and club sports, including hockey.

== Collegiate Hockey ==
=== 1960s: The Pembroke Pandas ===
In 1964, Nancy Schieffelin—who grew up playing hockey in her home state of New Jersey—began her freshman year at Pembroke College, the women's college in Brown University. After the Brown Bears men's coach, Jim Fullerton, saw her skating at the school's new rink, he arranged for Schieffelin to attend a team practiced disguised as a man.In an interview with Mary Byrne of The Belmont Voice in 2025, Schieffelin recalled:

The coach of the men's team saw me fooling around by myself with a stick and a puck...and he asked if I would come to practice for the men's team...The men's team was doing really poorly, and he wanted to get something fired up in them.

After the practice, Schieffelin approached Arlene Gorton, Pembroke's Director of Physical Education who was tasked with running all women's club-varsity teams, about starting a women's hockey team. Gorton agreed to support the creation of the team and became the driving force for its establishment.

The team, originally named the Pembroke Pandas, is recognized as the first varsity women's college hockey program in America (although non-varsity collegiate teams briefly existed at the University of Washington, Washington University in St. Louis, the University of Minnesota, and Carleton College in the 1920s). The team had a scant budget—players initially wore hand-me-down Peewee jerseys and helmets and field hockey shin pads over field hockey pants or blue jeans. As there were no other collegiate programs, the Pandas played pick-up games against faculty and spouses and a Rhode Island men's club in their first season. In the next few years, they played against the Walpole Brooms, a women's community team in Massachusetts. In the late 1960s, the team travelled to Canada to play Canadian collegiate women's teams, selling chocolate bars to charter buses to these away games.

=== 1970s: Collegiate Hockey Spreads ===
==== Cornell Big Red ====
In 1971, Cornell freshman Reggie Baker recruited 23 women for an ice hockey team. Baker, who grew up close to campus and whose father was a professor at the school, had been planning to start the team for years prior to matriculation. In eighth grade, Baker approached her science teacher, Gail Murphy, about coaching the team. Baker also distributed fliers around campus about the team during her senior year of high school.

While the club team was officially formed in 1971, the athletics office denied them ice time as they were not an official varsity sport. Consequently, the first season was spent doing off-ice conditioning at Schoellkopf Field. Baker continued to push the athletics department for ice time, and with the help of her father got the team recognized as a varsity sport for the 1972–1973 season.

==== Providence Friars ====
Only a two years after admitting in women in 1971, a women's intramural ice hockey program formed at Providence College for the 1973–1974 season. As the school was preparing to move more women's sports to varsity status to comply with Title IX, a survey was distributed to female students to determine which sports women were most interested in; ice hockey ranked in the top five most popular sports for women at Providence. Accordingly, women's hockey officially became a varsity sport at Providence for the 1974–1975 season, making the Friars the third varsity collegiate team in the country.

==== Colby Mules ====
Women's hockey started as a club sport at Colby in the 1973–1974 season. In February 1973, Colby held the first intercollegiate women's ice hockey game in the United States. The women's team made varsity status in 1975.

==== Yale Bulldogs ====
In the 1974–1975 season, Yale women's ice hockey started as a club sport. Russ McCurdy, who was coaching the men's freshmen team at the time, helped coach the new women's team. The team became an official varsity sport in the 1977–1978 season.

==== UNH Wildcats ====
The University of New Hampshire's women's ice hockey team started as a club around the same time as Yale's team, also gaining varsity status for the 1977–1978 season. Russ McCurdy left Yale to serve as the team's first head coach, and remained there for the next fifteen seasons. The UNH Wildcats went undefeated for their first four seasons, with an unbeaten streak of 74 games and a 57-game winning streak. As of 2026, McCurdy has the highest winning percentage of any women's collegiate ice hockey coach.

==== Harvard Crimson ====
Women's ice hockey began in the 1977–1978 season, largely due to the efforts of students Lauren Norton, Tania Huber, and Nelia Worsley. Huber and Norton had started a women's team while high schoolers at Concord Academy, and with the help of Worsley, approached then men's coach Bill Cleary for advice on starting a women's team at Harvard. Cleary suggested that Joe Bertagna, former Harvard goalie, coach.

The team gained varsity status for the 1978–1979 season.

==== Other Teams ====
Dartmouth Big Green (inaugural varsity season 1978–1979, club team prior), Princeton Tigers (inaugural varsity season 1979–1980), Wesleyan Cardinals (inaugural varsity season 1977–1978), and Rochester Institute of Technology (RIT) Tigers (inaugural varsity season 1975–1976) also gained varsity status in the 70s. Both schools had club teams prior to varsity.

Other schools with club teams in the 1970s included: Middlebury College Panthers (club team 1975, varsity 1981), Northeastern University Huskies (played in first women's Beanpot in 1979, varsity 1980), Boston College Eagles (played in first women's Beanpot in 1979), Boston University Terriers (played in first women's Beanpot in 1979), Williams College Ephs (club 1973, varsity 1990s), Colgate Raiders (club team 1973), and the RPI Engineers (club team 1977).

== AWCHA ==
In 1997–98, the American Women's College Hockey Alliance debuted. It was a program funded through the USOC/NCAA Conference Grant Program. The AWCHA organized and developed activities with collegiate women's varsity ice hockey teams, and helped to promote women's ice hockey at all NCAA levels. The first AWCHA Division I National Ice Hockey Championship was held in March 1998. The New Hampshire Wildcats defeated the Brown Bears by a 4–1 score, to become the first recognized national champion in women's college ice hockey. In the 1999–2000 season, the Western Collegiate Hockey Association (WCHA) joined the Eastern College Athletic Conference (ECAC) as the second league in the nation to offer women's Division I competition.

There were two more AWCHA National Championships and then the NCAA became involved. In August 2000, the NCAA announced it would hold its first Division I Women's Ice Hockey National Championship. The Minnesota Duluth Bulldogs captured the first NCAA Division I Women's Ice Hockey Championship, defeating the St. Lawrence Skating Saints by a 4–2 tally on March 25, 2001.

== NCAA ==
=== Notable games ===
- February 28, 2010: The RPI Engineers women's ice hockey team made NCAA history. The Engineers beat Quinnipiac, 2–1, but it took five overtimes. It is now the longest college hockey game in NCAA history. Senior defenseman Laura Gersten had the game-winning goal. She registered it at 4:32 of the fifth overtime session to not only clinch the win, but the series victory. RPI advanced to the ECAC Hockey Women's Semifinals for the second consecutive season. The Engineers faced top ranked Cornell University.

=== Outdoor games ===
- On Friday, January 8, 2010, Boston's Fenway Park played host to a Hockey East doubleheader. In the first game, the New Hampshire Wildcats team faced off against the Northeastern Huskies team in an outdoor college hockey doubleheader in the first outdoor women's hockey game in the sport's history. Northeastern surged to a 2–0 lead, but New Hampshire rallied to win 5–3. The latter game featured the men's teams from Boston College and Boston University, which BU won 3–2.
- February 6, 2010: The No. 9 ranked Wisconsin Badgers team (16–10–3, 13–9–1 WCHA) defeated the Bemidji State Beavers team (8–14–7, 7–9–7 WCHA), 6–1, in the first ever Culver's Camp Randall Hockey Classic at Camp Randall Stadium. The Badgers played in front of an NCAA-record crowd of 8,263 fans in the second-ever women's hockey outdoor showdown. Sophomore Carolyne Prevost scored the first goal in Camp Randall history at the 16:53 mark and backhanded it in to put the Badgers up 1–0. The Badgers dominated offensively, outshooting the Beavers 42–13. Freshman Becca Ruegsegger (Lakewood, Colorado) finished with 13 saves in net for Wisconsin.

== Professional hockey ==
=== NWHL ===
The National Women's Hockey League was formed in 2015 with four teams. Formed by Dani Rylan in March 2015 with an estimated $2.5 million operating budget, it was the first women's professional hockey league to pay its players. Prior to the league's formation, the only choice for top level women's hockey in North America was the Canadian Women's Hockey League (CWHL), which at the time paid bonuses and incentives but not salaries. The league's inaugural season ran on a salary cap of US $270,000 maximum per team and a $10,000 minimum per player. The players also earned 15% of profits from any NWHL jersey sold with their name on it. The league placed its four original teams in large hockey markets: the New York City area, Boston, Buffalo, and New England. In 2018 the league expanded to five teams, absorbing the Minnesota Whitecaps. In April 2020, a Toronto NWHL franchise was officially announced as the league's sixth team and first original expansion team, becoming the first expansion team to join the league since the collapse of the CWHL in 2019. Teams competed for the Isobel Cup, named after Lady Isobel Gathorne-Hardy, the daughter of Frederick Stanley, 16th Earl of Derby, donor of the Stanley Cup.

=== PWHPA ===
The Professional Women's Hockey Players Association (PWHPA) was founded in May 2019 following the dissolution of the CWHL and player's dissatisfaction in the operations of the NWHL. Although the NWHL was the first women's ice hockey league to pay its players (the CWHL only paid players stipends), it was still not considered a livable wage. The goal of the PWHPA was to create a sustainable professional league for women's ice hockey in North America that provided financial and infrastructure resources to players, health insurance, and support to training programs for young female players. With a large number of North American players boycotting the NWHL in support of the PWHPA, more than half of the signed players on opening rosters for the 2019–20 NWHL season were new to the league.

Due to their boycott, the members of the PWHPA decided to compete against one another on a tour to various North American cities, creating a series of exhibitions called the Dream Gap Tour, named after the gap between professional men's and women's hockey opportunities. Eventually, the COVID-19 pandemic caused public events to be cancelled, effectively ending the season. They continued the tour the following season, resulting in the 2020–21 PWHPA season.

In 2019 and 2020, select NWHL and PWHPA players were invited to participate in the 2019 NHL All-Star Skills Competition and the 2020 NHL All-Star Weekend. They participated in skill competitions and had a USA vs Canada women's three-on-three game in 2020. NWHL star Kendall Coyne Schofield competed in the fastest skater event in 2019 alongside big names in the NHL such as Connor McDavid, Mat Barzal, and Nathan MacKinnon. She finished 7th out of 8 skaters, only a second behind the top skater Connor McDavid. Also in 2019, Brianna Decker completed a demonstration for the "premier passer" event included in the All-Star games. Although she was not part of the competition, fans complained that she deserved the $25,000 prize because she had finished three seconds ahead of the first-place winner. 2019 was the first time women's ice hockey players had competed in the events, but no one received any prizes. Instead, they were given appearance fees and a donation of $1 million towards girls hockey. Their appearances in the games raised awareness for women in a male dominated sport and garnered recognition of the NWHL and PWHPA.

=== PHF ===
In September 2021, the NWHL officially rebranded as the Premier Hockey Federation (PHF) alongside several structural changes including prioritizing private ownership of teams. Team salary caps were also doubled prior to the season, going from $150,000 per team to $300,000. The 2021–22 season, the league's first season under the PHF title, began in November 2021. PHF players were required to follow testing and quarantine protocols due the outbreak of the COVID-19 Omicron variant.

On January 18, 2022, the league announced that the 2022–23 salary cap would more than double to $750,000 per team, and players would receive full healthcare benefits and an equity stake in the teams. Additionally, the league confirmed plans to add an expansion team in Montreal, which resulted in the creation of a seventh team, the Montreal Force, in 2022. In December 2022, the salary cap for the 2023–24 PHF season was set at $1.5 million per team, double the 2022–23 cap of $750,000. The increase aligned with the Board of Governors' pledge, made in 2021, to invest $25 million directly in pay and benefits to PHF players over the ensuing three seasons. This signified a 900 percent growth over the 2021 salary cap.

=== PWHL ===
On June 30, 2023, the Premier Hockey Federation announced that the league had been sold to the Mark Walter Group. This buyout voided all PHF player contracts for the upcoming season and PHF players were not allowed to be parties to negotiations toward a collective bargaining agreement between the PWHPA and the new league before its ratification. PHF players were then required to renegotiate their contracts with the new league or participate in the new league's draft if they wanted to continue their professional hockey careers in North America.

On August 29, 2023, it was announced that the new league would be known as the PWHL and that the six charter franchises would be based in Toronto, Ottawa, Montreal, Boston, New York, and Minneapolis-St. Paul. All six teams were allowed to sign three players during an initial 10-day free agency period. Following the free agency period, the 2023 PWHL Draft was held in Toronto on September 18. The 15-round draft saw 90 players selected from a pool of 286 eligible players. Since the new league would have one fewer team than the PHF and five fewer than the PHF and PWHPA combined, many players from both organizations were not drafted or signed during the PWHL's free-agency period. The PWHL's inaugural game was held on January 1, 2024, between New York and Toronto.

== Notable teams ==
=== Connecticut Polar Bears ===
The Connecticut Polar Bears are an ice hockey league for girls under the age of 19 in Connecticut. Numerous players from the Polar Bears have gone on to careers in college hockey at the NCAA Division I and Division III levels. In 1985, Maurice FitzMaurice's daughter Marnie wanted the opportunity to play ice hockey among girls. FitzMaurice and a few other fathers decided to organize a Pee Wee Girls program. The result was the Connecticut Polar Bears. It is the only all-girls ice hockey program in Connecticut, which consists of eleven teams.

Since its beginnings, FitzMaurice has been the President of the Polar Bears. He was also one of the organizers of one of the largest Christmas tournaments in North America. In 2007, the tournament hosted about 275 teams. Games were played across Connecticut. The program has produced numerous Olympians, including Julie Chu, Jamie Hagerman, Hilary Knight, Sue Merz, A. J. Mleczko, Kim Insalaco, Angela Ruggiero, Sarah Vaillancourt, and Gretchen Ulion.

- The Polar Bears have won 10 championships at the national level.

Year	City	Results
1986	Detroit, MI	Peewee team won in final over Assabet, MA 7–0
1990	Detroit, MI	Midget team won in OT final against Assabet, MA 2–1
1991	Boston, MA	Midget team won in final against Michigan 3–2
1995	Syracuse, NY	Peewee team won in double OT final against Assabet, MA 2–1
1996	Bloomington, MN	Peewee team won in final against Assabet, MA 5–2
1997	Boston, MA	Peewee team won in final against Minnesota 5–2
1997	Boston, MA	Midget team won in final against Minnesota 3–1
1998	Anaheim, CA	Midget team won in final against Team California 3–0
1999	Minneapolis MN	Midget team won in final against Minnesota 2–1
2004	Rochester, NY	Midget team won in final against Assabet 4–0

=== Minnesota Whitecaps ===
Minnesota first competed for the Clarkson Cup in 2009 in Kingston, Ontario. The team lost to the Montreal Stars in a one-game final, 3 goals to 1. In 2010, the Minnesota Whitecaps became the first United States based team to win the Clarkson Cup, doing so by defeating the Brampton Thunder, 4 goals to none. In 2019, after moving to the National Women's Hockey League, the Whitecaps became the only team to win both the Clarkson Cup and the Isobel Cup after beating the Buffalo Beauts by a score of 2 goals to one.

== Timeline of events ==
- 1971: The first known girls' youth hockey program in Minnesota is established by the Lake Region Hockey Association. The first game is played in Arden Hills, Minnesota on January 10.
- 1980: The Amateur Hockey Association of the United States (known today as USA Hockey) hosts the first national championships for girls' pee wee and midget divisions. A team from Taylor, Michigan wins the inaugural pee wee tournament. A team from Wayzata, Minn., is the first girls' midget National Champion.
- 1981: Senior women are included in USA Hockey's National Championships. Assabet Valley, Massachusetts, wins the Senior A National Championship, while Cape Cod, Massachusetts, wins the Senior B crown.
- 1984: The Providence Friars women's hockey program wins the inaugural Eastern College Athletic Conference Women's Championship.
- 1993: Women's hockey is included at the U.S. Olympic Festival for the first time ever. The festival is held in San Antonio, Texas and the US women's team defeats Canada in a two-game series for the gold medal.
- 1994: The third IIHF Women's World Championship is held in the United States for the first time. The venue is Lake Placid, New York. Canada wins the gold medal game by a 6–3 mark against the U.S. Finland defeats China, 8–1, to finish third once again.
- 1995: On March 25, Apple Valley High School defeats the South St. Paul Packers, 2–0, to become the first Minnesota girls' state high school champion.
- 1995: The inaugural IIHF Pacific Rim Women's Hockey Championship, featuring the U.S., Canada, China and Japan, is held in San Jose, California. The Canadian team defeats the U.S. in an overtime shootout to win the gold medal.
- 1998: The USA Women's Hockey Team wins the gold medal against the Canada in the first ever Olympic women's ice hockey tournament at the 1998 Winter Olympics in Nagano, Japan. The USA women defeated Canada 3–1.
- 2018: The USA Women's Hockey Team defeats Canada 3–2 in the shootout to win the gold medal at the 2018 Winter Olympics in Pyeongchang, South Korea.

== Figures ==
- Laura Stamm was a power skating instructor in the 1970s and 1980s for several NHL teams, including the New York Rangers, New Jersey Devils and Los Angeles Kings.
- Bella Hartman played for the University of New Hampshire Wildcats and was a member of the United States national team in the late 1980s and early 1990s.
- Erin Nohl played for the Providence Friars and was a member of several U.S. national teams in the early 1990s.
- On October 30, 1993, goaltender Erin Whitten made history by becoming the first woman to record a victory in a professional hockey game. As a member of the East Coast Hockey League's Toledo Storm, she posted a 6–5 win against the Dayton Bombers. In 1994 she received the first-ever USA Hockey Women's Hockey Player of the Year Award. On March 7, 1996, she became the first woman to appear in a professional hockey game in a position other than goaltender, when, as a member of the Colonial Hockey League's Flint Generals, she played at forward for 18 seconds in a game against the Madison Monsters.
- Lynn Olson is considered the godmother of girls' and women's hockey in Minnesota. She was part of the movement that led Minnesota to become the first state to recognize girls' hockey as a varsity sport, in 1994.
- Laura Halldorson was a coach for the University of Minnesota Golden Gophers, and played at Princeton with Patty Kazmaier. In addition, she played with Cindy Curley and Lauren Apollo on the earliest U.S. National teams. Five of the players she coached at Minnesota would later become Olympians themselves, including 2006 U.S. captain Krissy Wendell.
- The late Patty Kazmaier played for the Princeton Tigers. An award for the best player in women's college hockey is named in her honor.
- On September 13, 2011, Buffalo native Lexi Peters became the first female ice hockey player to appear in an EA Sports NHL Hockey video game, in EA Sports NHL 12. In previous experiences with EA Sports' NHL titles, she spent hours with the custom team features in an attempt to recreate the Purple Eagles (an all-girls team Peters plays for). The various titles' player creation options did not include a female character build. Peters asked her father why there were no female characters in past video games. Her dad suggested that she write a letter to the company and inquire about it. David Littman, the lead producer of the EA Sports NHL game, received permission from the NHL and EA's lawyers to include Lexi Peters in their EA Sports NHL 12 video game (released on September 13, 2011). EA Sports informed Lexi that they were going to have her as the game's "default" female player that gamers would be able to customize.

== Minnesota ==
Minnesota maintains programs for ice hockey at the high school, collegiate, and professional levels, including women's hockey. Women’s club hockey began at the University of Minnesota in 1918. The state currently has professional women's leagues.

In 1994, more than 500 member schools were sent letters by the Minnesota State high school league. The intent was to determine how many schools were interested in starting girls' ice hockey teams. Twenty-four expressed interest as the league was looking for a new sport for Title IX purposes. On March 21, 1994, the Minnesota State High School League sanctioned girls' ice hockey. Minnesota became the first state in the U.S. to sanction girls' ice hockey as a high school varsity sport. On March 25, 1995, Apple Valley High School defeated the South St. Paul Packers, 2–0, to become the first Minnesota girls' state high school champion.

From 1994 to 2002, the number of varsity girls' teams in Minnesota expanded from 24 to 125 (in two classifications, AA and A). In 2001, a three-day girls' state tournament attracted 15,551 spectators. In 1994 there were 1,863 girls in the state participating in organized hockey outside of a varsity high school program. In 2002, the number increased to 6,856.

=== NCAA Division I Programs ===
Minnesota’s high school traditions have been linked into collegiate hockey, where Division I programs are held.

As of the 2024–2025 season, there were 681 US-born NCAA Division I women hockey players. Minnesota led all states with 202 players followed by Massachusetts with 114 players and New York state in a distant third with 52 players. This number only represents the number of players who were born in the state. It does not include players who moved to Minnesota to play high school or prep hockey.

The primary NCAA Division I women’s hockey programs in Minnesota include:

- Minnesota Golden Gophers women's ice hockey
- Minnesota Duluth Bulldogs women's ice hockey
- St. Cloud State Huskies women's ice hockey
- Minnesota State Mavericks women's ice hockey
- Bemidji State Beavers women's ice hockey
- St. Thomas Tommies women's ice hockey

=== Minnesota’s Professional Women’s Hockey League (PWHL) Pipeline ===
Minnesota has played a major role in producing Professional Women's Hockey League (PWHL) talent. Currently the league has 75 U.S.-born players with nearly half (37) having played either high school or prep / academy hockey in Minnesota. Twenty-three (23) players were born, raised, and played high school hockey in the Minneapolis–St. Paul metropolitan area, 3 players moved to the Twin Cities area and played high school hockey, and 11 current players moved to the state to play for Shattuck-Saint Mary's in Faribault, Minnesota.

== Awards ==
=== Sarah Devens Award ===
Established in 1996, the Sarah Devens Award is awarded jointly by the ECAC and Hockey East. The award is named in honor of former Dartmouth Big Green ice hockey player, Sarah Devens, who died in 1995 prior to her senior year. Kathryn Waldo, a forward from Northeastern University Huskies, was the first recipient. Waldo had cystic fibrosis, and despite health challenges, was a stand-out player for the Huskies during her four years. She finished her career with 106 points in 52 goals and 54 assists.

Year	Player	School
1996–97	Kathryn Waldo	Northeastern
1997–98	Sarah Hood	Dartmouth
1998–99	Jaime Totten	Northeastern
1999–2000	Carrie Jokiel	New Hampshire
2000–01	Christina Sorbara	Brown
2001–02	Dianna Bell	Cornell
2002–03	Rachel Barrie	St. Lawrence
2003–04	Lindsay Charlebois	Harvard
2004–05	Nicole Corriero	Harvard
2005–06	Karen Thatcher	Providence
2006–07	Lindsay Williams	Clarkson
2007–08	Lizzie Keady	Princeton
2008–09	Marianna Locke	St. Lawrence
2009–10	Laura Gersten	Rensselaer
2010–11	Jackee Snikeris	Yale
2011–12	Aleca Hughes	Yale
2012–13	Alyssa Zupon	Yale
2013–14	Vanessa Gagnon	Clarkson
2014–15	Chelsea Laden	Quinnipiac
2015–16	Alison Rolandelli	Brown
2016–17	Paula Voorheis	Cornell
2017–18	Taylor Willard	Vermont
2018–19	Mackenzie Lancaster	Quinnipiac
2019–20	Sammy Davis	Boston University
2020–21	Grace Markey	Quinnipiac
2021–22	Gianna Meloni	Yale
2022–23	Kate Reilly	Quinnipiac
2022–23	Carly Beniek	Holy Cross

=== Minnesota Ms. Hockey Award ===
Year	Player	School
1996	Winny Brodt	Roseville
1997	Annamarie Holmes	Apple Valley
1998	Laura Slominski	Burnsville
1999	Ronda Curtin	Roseville
2000	Krissy Wendell	Park Center
2001	Renee Curtin	Roseville
2002	Ashley Albrecht	South St. Paul
2003	Andrea Nichols	Hibbing/Chisholm
2004	Erica McKenzie	Hastings
2005	Gigi Marvin	Warroad
2006	Allie Thunstrom	North St. Paul
2007	Katharine Chute	Blake
2008	Sarah Erickson	Bemidji
2009	Becky Kortum	Hopkins
2010	Bethany Brausen	Roseville Area
2011	Karley Sylvester	Warroad
2012	Hannah Brandt	Hill-Murray
2013	Dani Cameranesi	Blake
2014	Sydney Baldwin	Minnetonka
2015	Taylor Williamson	Edina
2016	Presley Norby	Minnetonka
2017	Grace Zumwinkle	Breck
2018	Taylor Heise	Red Wing
2019	Madeline Wethington	Blake
2020	Olivia Mobley	Breck
2021	Peyton Hemp	Andover
2022	Vivian Jungels	Edina
2023	Ella Boerger	Andover
2024	Ayla Puppe	Northfield

=== Patty Kazmaier Award ===
Year	Winner	Position	School
1998	Brandy Fisher	Forward	New Hampshire
1999	A.J. Mleczko	Forward	Harvard
2000	Ali Brewer	Goaltender	Brown
2001	Jennifer Botterill	Forward	Harvard
2002	Brooke Whitney	Forward	Northeastern
2003	Jennifer Botterill	Forward	Harvard
2004	Angela Ruggiero	Defense	Harvard
2005	Krissy Wendell	Forward	Minnesota
2006	Sara Bauer	Forward	Wisconsin
2007	Julie Chu	Forward	Harvard
2008	Sarah Vaillancourt	Forward	Harvard
2009	Jessie Vetter	Goaltender	Wisconsin
2010	Vicki Bendus	Forward	Mercyhurst
2011	Meghan Duggan	Forward	Wisconsin
2012	Brianna Decker	Forward	Wisconsin
2013	Amanda Kessel	Forward	Minnesota
2014	Jamie Lee Rattray	Forward	Clarkson
2015	Alex Carpenter	Forward	Boston College
2016	Kendall Coyne	Forward	Northeastern
2017	Ann-Renée Desbiens	Goaltender	Wisconsin
2018	Daryl Watts	Forward	Boston College
2019	Loren Gabel	Forward	Clarkson
2020	Élizabeth Giguère	Forward	Clarkson
2021	Aerin Frankel	Goaltender	Northeastern
2022	Taylor Heise	Forward	Minnesota
2023	Sophie Jaques	Defense	Ohio State
2024	Izzy Daniel	Forward	Cornell

=== Joe Burke award ===
The Joe Burke Award was established in 1994. It is presented annually to the person who has given outstanding contribution, support, and dedication to women's ice hockey. Joe Burke was a Dedham resident but never actually played the game himself. The first game he attended was the University of New Hampshire and Boston College in 1978 at McHugh Forum. Since that game, Burke has been at every major girls'/women's hockey event in the New England area.

Year	Winner	Background
1994	Joe Burke	Women's hockey supporter, fan
1995	John Dooley	Harvard University
1996	Bernie McKinnon	St. Lawrence University
1997	Joe Bertagna	ECAC/Hockey East, Harvard
1998	Carl Gray	Assabet Valley, USA Hockey
1999	Award not given out	
2000	Award not given out	
2001	Russ McCurdy	University of New Hampshire
2002	Bette Blair	USA Hockey, volunteer
2003	Jane Ring	St. Paul, MN
2004	George Crowe	Dartmouth
2005	Bill Cahill	Rensselaer
2006	Charlie Stryker	MN Hockey
2007	Sue Ring-Jarvi	MN girls'/women's hockey
2008	Maurice FitzMaurice	Connecticut Polar Bears
2009	Bob and Kathleen Ridder	University of Minnesota
2010	Kelly Dyer Hayes	USA Hockey
2011	Kush Sidhu	Washington Pride, Northeastern
2012	Bob Allen	USA Hockey and Lake Placid Olympic Center
2013	Brian Schulz	USCHO
2014	Mary Ann Robinson	Wisconsin Amateur Hockey
2015	Lynn Olson	Minnesota Hockey, USA Hockey
2016	Bob Ewell	Colby, Princeton, New Hampton
2017	George Griggs	Women's Hockey Supporter

=== Laura Hurd Award ===
The Laura Hurd Award is given to the NCAA Division III Women's Ice Hockey Player of the Year. It is named for Elmira College star Laura Hurd, a four-time All-American who lead her team to the first Division III championship.

Year	Winner	School	Position
2000	Sylvia Ryan	Middlebury	Forward
2001	Michelle Labbe	Middlebury	Forward
2002	Sarah Moe	Gustavus Adolphus	Forward
2003	Angela Kapus	Middlebury	Forward / Defense
2004	Molly Wasserman	Williams	Forward
2005	Laura Hurd	Elmira	Forward
2006	Emily Quizon	Middlebury	Forward
2007	Andrea Peterson	Gustavus Adolphus	Defense
2008	Danielle Blanchard	Plattsburgh	Forward
2009	Kayla Coady	Elmira	Forward
2010	Isabel Iwachiw	Trinity	Goaltender
2011	Sarah Dagg	RIT	Forward
2012	Julie Fortier	Norwich	Forward
2013	Teal Gove	Plattsburgh	Forward
2014	Sydney Aveson	Plattsburgh	Goaltender
2015	Ashley Ryan	Elmira	Forward
2016	Michelle Greeneway	Lake Forest	Forward
2017	Dani Sibley	UW-River Falls	Forward
2018	Melissa Sheeran	Plattsburgh	Forward
2019	Bre Simon	Hamline	Forward
2020	Amanda Conway	Norwich	Forward
2021	Not awarded		
2022	Callie Hoff	UW-River Falls	Forward
2023	Darci Matson	Aurora	Forward
2024	Maddie McCollins	UW-River Falls	Forward

=== Bob Allen Women's Player of the Year Award ===
Year	Winner
1995	Karyn Bye
1996	Cammi Granato
1997	Laurie Baker
1998	Karyn Bye
1999	A.J. Mleczko
2000	Sara DeCosta-Hayes
2001	Krissy Wendell
2002	Sara DeCosta-Hayes
2003	Angela Ruggiero
2004	Angela Ruggiero
2005	Natalie Darwitz
2006	Katie King
2007	Julie Chu
2008	Caitlin Cahow
2009	Jessie Vetter
2010	Jenny Potter
2011	Meghan Duggan
2012	Kelli Stack
2013	Amanda Kessel
2014	Hilary Knight
2015	Brianna Decker
2016	Monique Lamoureux-Morando
2017	Brianna Decker

=== Other awards ===
- Krissy Wendell, 2005 Bob Johnson Award
- Natalie Darwitz, 2008 Bob Johnson Award
- 2009 U.S. Women's National Under-18 Team, 2009 Bob Johnson Award
- 2009 U.S. Women's National Team, 2009 Bob Johnson Award

== International tournaments ==
The following women's ice hockey tournaments (featuring teams from other nations) were contested in the United States.

Year	Tournament	Location	Winner
1994	1994 IIHF Women's World Championship	Lake Placid, New York	Canada women's national ice hockey team
1995	1995 Women's Pacific Rim Championship	San Jose, California	Canada women's national ice hockey team
2001	2001 Women's World Ice Hockey Championships	Minneapolis, Minnesota	Canada women's national ice hockey team
2002	Ice hockey at the 2002 Winter Olympics	Salt Lake City, Utah	Canada women's national ice hockey team
2010	2010 IIHF World Women's U18 Championship	Chicago, Illinois	Canada women's national ice hockey team
2017	2017 IIHF Women's World Championship	Plymouth Township, Michigan	United States women's national ice hockey team
2017	2017 Four Nations Cup	Tampa, Florida	United States women's national ice hockey team

== Famous firsts ==
- January 28, 2005: Angela Ruggiero played for the Tulsa Oilers in a Central Hockey League game against the Rio Grande Valley Killer Bees. She was the first woman to actively play in a regular season professional hockey game in the United States at a position other than goalie. In addition, since her brother Bill Ruggiero also played for the Oilers, they were the first brother-sister combination to play professionally at the same time.
- 2009: Alex Rigsby was the first female to be drafted by the United States Hockey League. She was selected by the Chicago Steel. She went on to play for the Wisconsin Badgers women's ice hockey program.

== Number of registered players ==
- 1990–91: USA Hockey counts 2,700 women participating in ice hockey.
- 1993–94: USA Hockey count reveals that the number of women participants has increased to 6,300.
- 1997–98: USA Hockey now reports 23,010 female players.
- 1998: Women's ice hockey becomes an Olympic medal sport at the Winter Games in Nagano, Japan, with the U.S. women winning the gold medal.
- 2005: The number of U.S. female hockey players reaches 52,469.
- 2006–07: 57,549 female players registered
- 2009–2010: 61,612 female players registered
- 2010–11: 65,509 female players registered
- 2013–14: 67, 230 female players registered
- 2014–15: 69,744 female players registered
- Article by Mike Murphy (theicegarden.com) September 5, 2018, 8:30am EDT: "At the inaugural IIHF Women’s Ice Hockey Workshop in Copenhagen in July, IIHF Women’s Committee Chairwoman Zsuzsanna Kolbenheyer shared that there are now nearly 200,000 women playing hockey across the world; in 2010 there were just over 170,000. That’s a growth of 17.64 percent in eight years."

== See also ==
- Title IX
- National Collegiate Women's Ice Hockey Championship
- Black players in ice hockey
- LGBTQ people in ice hockey

=== In other countries ===
- Austria women's ice hockey Bundesliga
- Canadian women's ice hockey history
- German women's ice hockey Bundesliga
- Women's ice hockey in Finland
- Women's ice hockey in Great Britain
- Women's ice hockey in Sweden
