= 1914–15 Army Cadets men's ice hockey season =

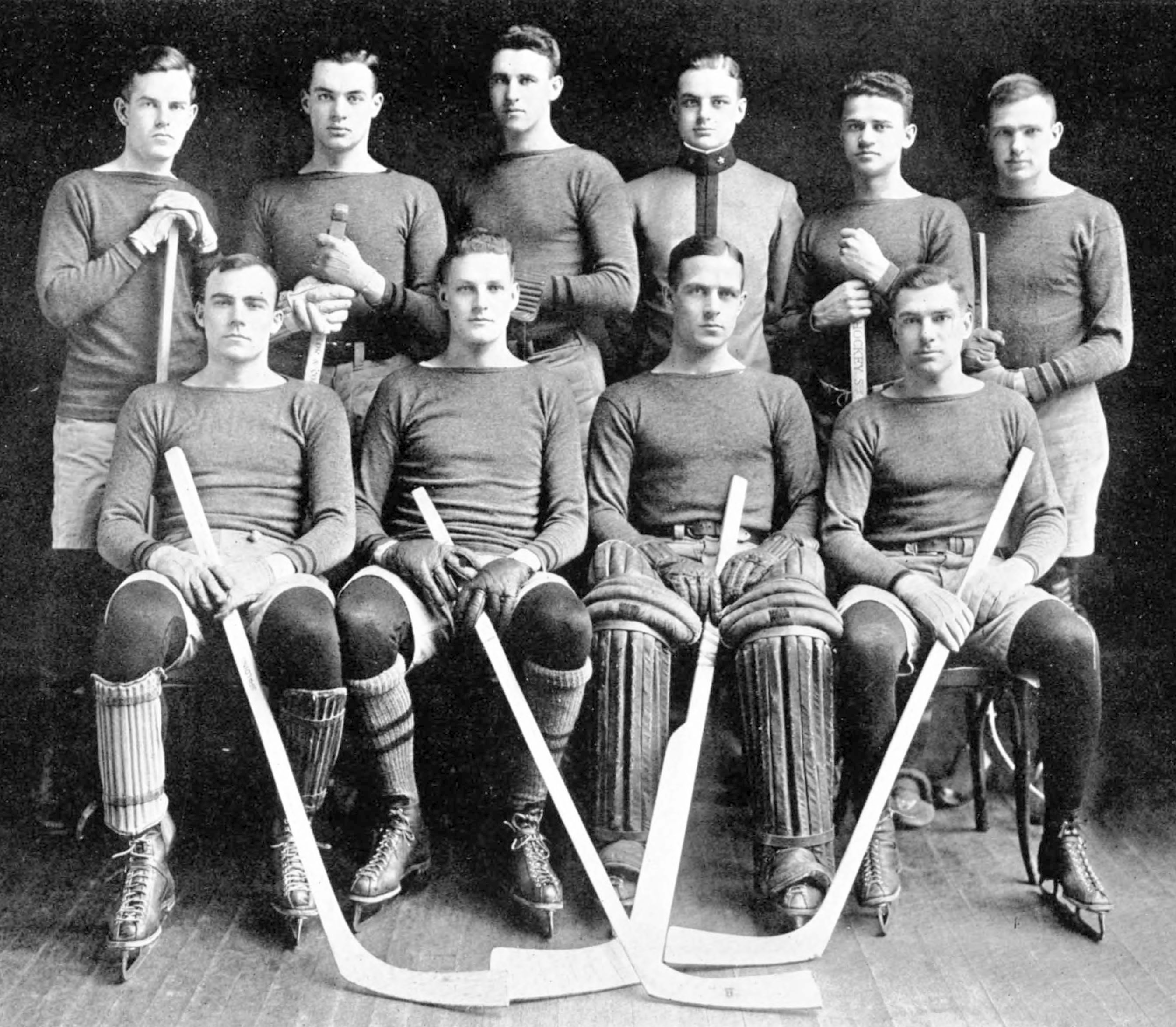
- Conference: Independent
- Home ice: Stuart Rink

Record
- Overall: 1–4–0

Coaches and captains
- Head coach: Frank Purdon
- Captain: Robert Strong

The 1914–15 Army Cadets men's ice hockey season was the 12th season of play for the program.

== Season ==
Army continued to rotate freshly graduated officers as the head coach of their hockey team. In 1914 Frank Purdon was given the job and, after a poor start, the team played well through most of the season. The Cadets lost most of their games but three were one-goal decisions. In their final game of the year, Army and Columbia played a 6-on-6 game rather than the standard 7-on-7 format.

== Roster ==
No.	Nat.	Player	Class	Pos	Height	Weight	DoB	Hometown	Previous team
	(United States)	Latham L. Brundred	Junior	D			1893-10-02	Pennsylvania
	(United States)	Loyd Van H. Durfee	Freshman	LW			1895-12-23	Ohio
	(United States)	Elbert L. Ford Jr.	Sophomore	C			1892-12-02	Milford, Connecticut
	(United States)	Edwin J. House	Freshman	LW			1895-07-06	New York
	(United States)	Felix R. McLean	Junior	RW			1889-10-08	New York
	(United States)	William F. Redfield	Sophomore	D			1894-04-21	New York
	(United States)	Robert W. Strong (C)	Senior	G			1890-03-12	Kingsville, Ohio

== Standings ==
1914–15 Collegiate ice hockey standings
	Intercollegiate							Overall					
	GP	W	L	T	PCT.	GF	GA	GP	W	L	T	GF	GA
Army	3	0	3	0	.000	3	11	5	1	4	0	7	13
Columbia	4	2	2	0	.500	7	16	4	2	2	0	7	16
Cornell	4	1	3	0	.250	11	17	4	1	3	0	11	17
Dartmouth	5	4	1	0	.800	16	10	7	4	3	0	20	17
Harvard	9	8	1	0	.889	49	16	13	9	4	0	51	22
Massachusetts Agricultural	10	5	5	0	.500	32	22	10	5	5	0	32	22
MIT	5	0	5	0	.000	6	20	6	0	6	0	6	28
Princeton	9	4	5	0	.444	17	24	12	6	6	0	28	34
Rensselaer	3	0	3	0	.000	0	14	3	0	3	0	0	14
Trinity	–	–	–	–	–	–	–	–	–	–	–	–	–
Williams	7	4	3	0	.571	14	17	7	4	3	0	14	17
WPI	–	–	–	–	–	–	–	–	–	–	–	–	–
Yale	10	7	3	0	.700	32	21	16	9	7	0	56	43
YMCA College	–	–	–	–	–	–	–	–	–	–	–	–	–

== Schedule and results ==
Date	Opponent	Site	Result	Record
Regular Season
January 9	Massachusetts Agricultural*	Stuart Rink • West Point, New York	L 1–7	0–1–0
January 22	YMCA College*	Stuart Rink • West Point, New York	L 1–2	0–2–0
	N.Y. National Guard 7th Regiment*	Stuart Rink • West Point, New York	W 3–0	1–2–0
	M.V.M. Battalion "A"*	Stuart Rink • West Point, New York	L 1–2	1–3–0
February 10	Columbia*	Stuart Rink • West Point, New York	L 1–2	1–4–0
*Non-conference game.
