= Harry Denesha =

Canadian-born American ice hockey player and coach (1887–1936)

Biographical details
- Born: September 2, 1887; South Mountain, Ontario, Canada
- Died: June 9, 1936 (aged 48); New York, New York, U.S.

Playing career
- 1896–1906: Morrisburg
- 1909–1912: New York A. C.
- 1912: Intercolonials
- 1912–1913: Pilgrim A. C.
- 1914–1915: Boston Arenas

Coaching career (HC unless noted)
- 1912–1913: Amherst
- 1914–1915: Boston Arenas
- 1914–1915: MIT
- 1916–1917: Boston Girls' Hockey Team
- 1924–1926: Dartmouth

Harry Russell Denesha (September 2, 1887 – June 9, 1936) was a Canadian-born American ice hockey player and coach who was the head coach of the Dartmouth Big Green men's ice hockey from 1924 to 1926.

== Early life ==
Denesha was born on September 2, 1887 in South Mountain, Ontario to American-born parents William A. Denesha and Hattie M. Denesha. His family moved to Morrisburg, Ontario when he was one year old. Denesha attended the Morrisburg Collegiate Institute and played hockey for the local amateur club.

== Hockey ==
In 1909, he moved to New York City, where he played for the New York Athletic Club. In February 1912, he moved to Boston and joined the Intercolonials. The following season, he was a member of the Pilgrim Athletic Club.

From 1912 to 1913, Denesha was coach of the Amherst College hockey team. He coached the MIT Engineers during their 1914–15 season. He was also a player-coach for the Boston Arena Hockey Club that season.

In 1916, Denesha volunteered to coach the Boston Girls' Hockey Team, which was captained by his sister, Ruth Denesha. That same season, he began refereeing men's games at the Boston Arena.

During World War I, Denesha served with the 301st Engineer Regiment, which was part of the 76th Infantry Division.

From 1924 to 1926, compiled a 16–6–1 record as head coach of the Dartmouth College men's ice hockey team.

== Death ==
Denesha learned the construction trade during his youth and worked on projects in Detroit and Brooklyn. On June 8, 1936, he fell six stories from a scaffold while working on a building in Brooklyn. He died the following day from a fractured skull. He was buried at Brookside Cemetery in Waddington, New York.
