= Lexi Peters =

American ice hockey player

Lexi Peters (a native of Buffalo, New York) became the first female ice hockey player to appear in an EA Sports NHL Hockey video game after appearing in NHL 12.

== EA Sports ==
=== Origins ===
In previous experiences with EA Sports’ NHL titles, she spent hours with the custom team features in an attempt to recreate the Niagara Jr. Purple Eagles (an all-girls team Peters plays for). The various titles player creation options did not include a female character build. Peters asked her father why there were no female characters in past video games. Her dad suggested that she write a letter to the company and inquire about it. She has been playing hockey in the Buffalo area since 2007. David Littman, the lead producer of the EA Sports NHL Game received permission from the NHL and EA's lawyers to include Lexi Peters in their EA Sports NHL 12 video game (released on September 13, 2011). EA Sports informed Lexi that they were going to have her as the game's "default" female player that gamers would be able to customize.

== Awards and honors ==
Peters was selected by The Hockey News on its annual list of the 100 People of Power and Influence in Ice Hockey. For the 2012 list, Peters ranked at number 100.

Peters was included in the 2014 version of the Gamers edition of the Guinness Book of World Records.
