= Colgate Raiders football =

Football team representing Colgate University

2026 Colgate Raiders football team
- First season: 1890; 136 years ago
- Athletic director: Yariv Amir
- Head coach: Curt Fitzpatrick; 1st season, 5–7 (.417)
- Location: Hamilton, New York
- Stadium: Crown Field at Andy Kerr Stadium (capacity: 10,221)
- NCAA division: Division I FCS
- Conference: Patriot League
- Colors: Maroon and white
- All-time record: 681–534–50 (.558)

National championships
- Unclaimed: 1932

Conference championships
- Patriot League: 1997, 1999, 2002, 2003, 2005, 2008, 2012, 2015, 2017, 2018
- Consensus All-Americans: 6
- Rivalries: Cornell (rivalry); Syracuse (rivalry)

Uniforms
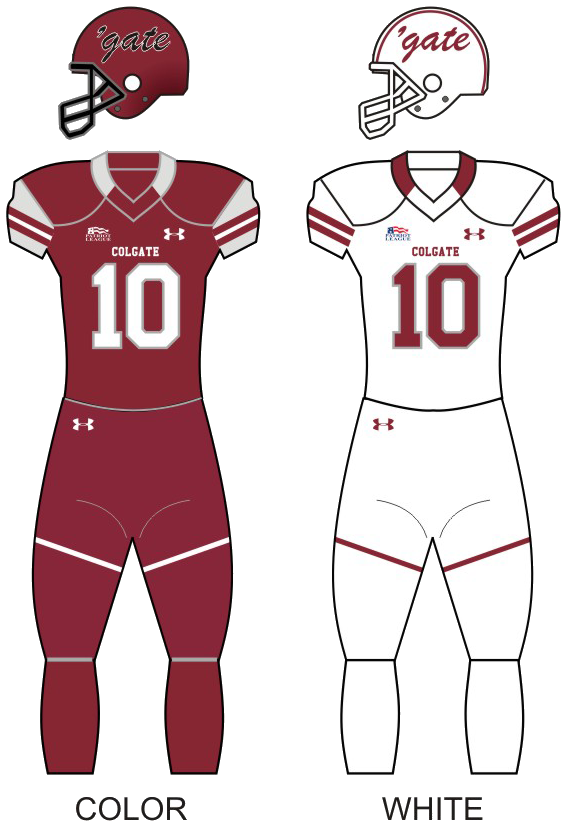
- Outfitter: Under Armour
- Website: GoColgateRaiders.com

The Colgate Raiders football team represents Colgate University in NCAA Division I Football Championship Subdivision (FCS) college football competition as a member of the Patriot League.

== History ==
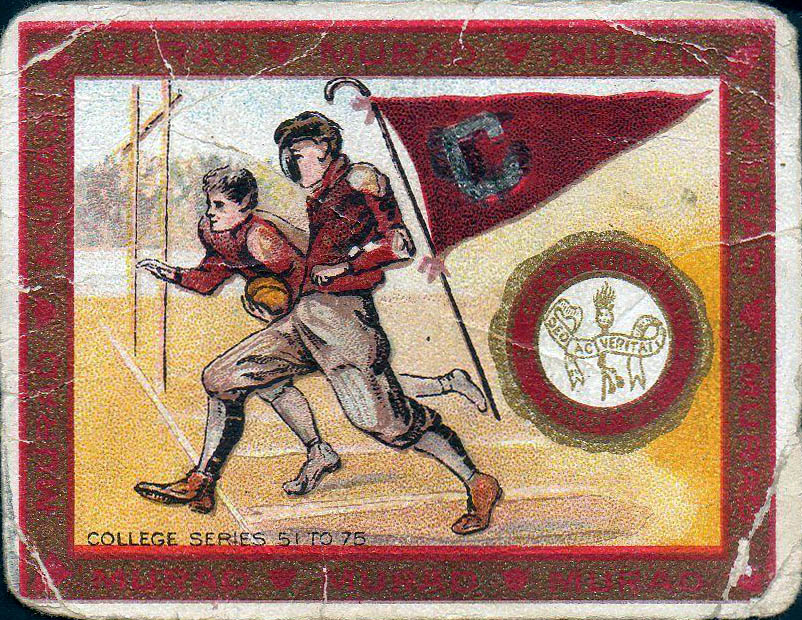
Colgate football team on a cigarette card by Turkish cigarettes company Murad (1910)

In 1915, Colgate recorded its 100th victory with a win over Army and also beat Yale on their way to a 5–1 finish. The following season, they compiled an 8–1 record, with the lone loss coming against Yale, 7–3.

During the Great Depression, there was a proliferation of postseason benefit games to raise money for the unemployed. On December 6, 1930, Colgate traveled to New York City's Yankee Stadium to play New York University (NYU) in one of these games and won, 7–0. In 1932, Colgate finished undefeated, untied and unscored upon with a 9–0 record. They outscored their opponents 234–0. Parke H. Davis selected the 1932 Red Raiders to share the national championship. They did not, however, receive an invitation to the 1933 Rose Bowl, and as such, have been referred to as "undefeated, untied, unscored upon, and uninvited." The team was considered as a candidate to play in the first Sugar Bowl in January 1935 but the honor went to Temple University.

In 1982, Colgate football was relegated from the Division I-A to Division I-AA (now FCS) level. Since then, the team has advanced to the playoffs numerous times. In 2003, Colgate advanced to the Division I-AA final, having won 15 straight games that season (12–0 Schedule, 3 Playoff Wins), becoming the first and only Patriot League team to ever do so (achieving a final record of 15–1). There, the Raiders lost to Delaware, 40–0. Two Raiders have received the Walter Payton Award for most outstanding player in Division I-AA: Kenny Gamble in 1987 and Jamaal Branch in 2003.

=== Classifications ===
- 1937–1972: NCAA University Division
- 1972–1977: NCAA Division I
- 1978–1981: NCAA Division I–A
- 1982–present: NCAA Division I–AA/FCS

=== Conference memberships ===
- 1890–1972: Independent
- 1973–1977: Division I Independent
- 1978–1981: Division I–A Independent
- 1982–1985: Division I–AA Independent
- 1986–present: Patriot League

== Achievements ==
=== National championships ===
Year	Selectors	Coach	Record
1932	Parke H. Davis	Andrew Kerr	9–0

=== Conference championships ===
Year	Conference	Coach	Overall record	Conference record
1997	Patriot League	Dick Biddle	7–5	6–0
1999	Patriot League	Dick Biddle	10–2	5–1
2002	Patriot League	Dick Biddle	9–3	6–1
2003	Patriot League	Dick Biddle (COY)	15–1	7–0
2005	Patriot League	Dick Biddle	8–4	5–1
2008	Patriot League	Dick Biddle	9–3	5–0
2012	Patriot League	Dick Biddle	8–4	5–0
2015	Patriot League	Dan Hunt	9–5	6–0
2017	Patriot League	Dan Hunt	7–4	5–1
2018	Patriot League	Dan Hunt	10–2	6–0

== Division I-AA/FCS Playoffs results ==
The Raiders have appeared in the I-AA/FCS playoffs 11 times with a record of 7–11.

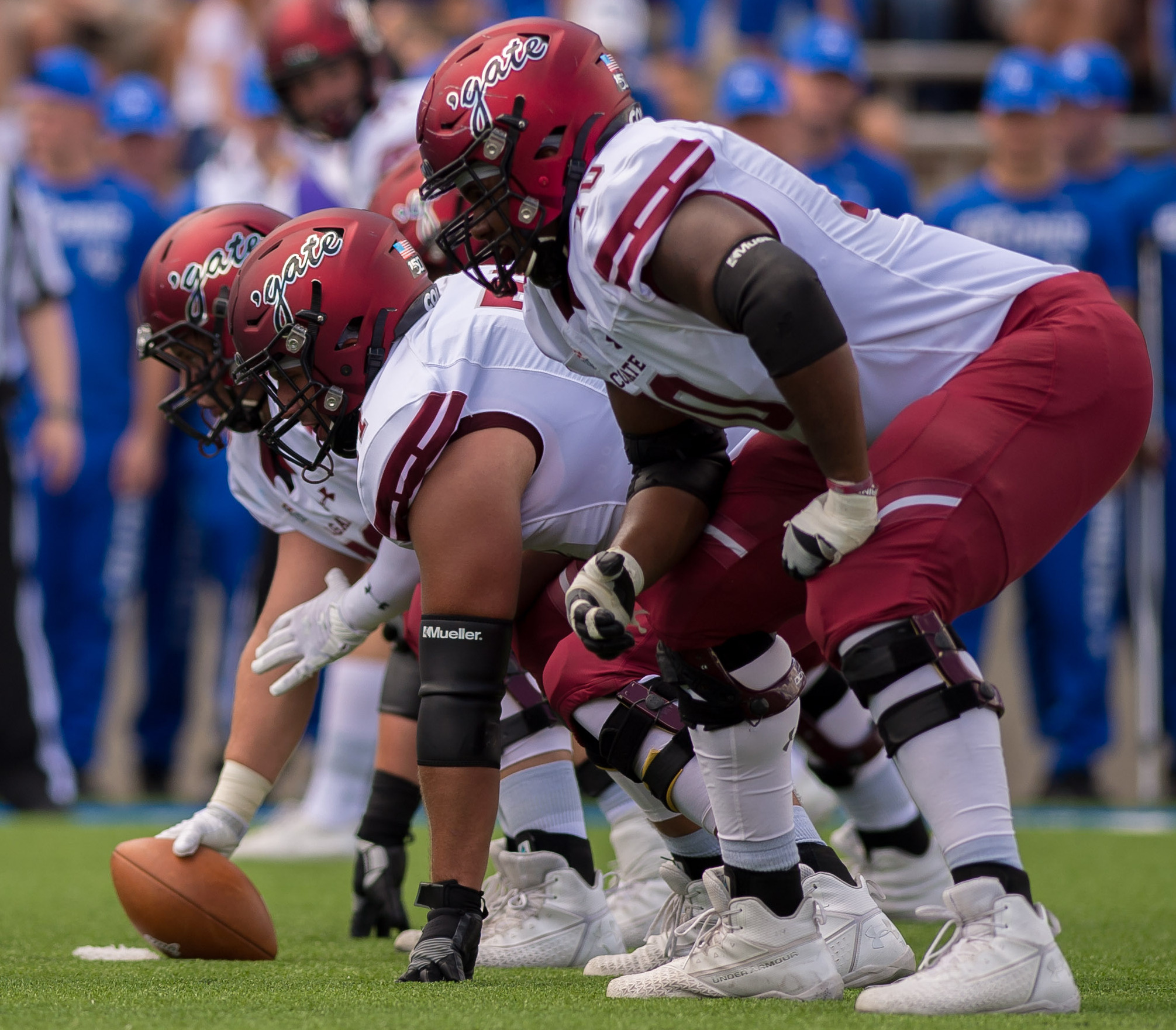
Colgate offensive linemen prepare for the snap during a 2019 game

Year	Round	Opponent	Result
1982	First Round; Quarterfinals	Boston University; Delaware	W 21–7; L 13–20
1983	First Round	Western Carolina	L 23–24
1997	First Round	Villanova	L 28–49
1998	First Round	Georgia Southern	L 28–49
1999	First Round	Illinois State	L 13–56
2003	First Round; Quarterfinals; Semifinals; National Championship Game	Massachusetts; Western Illinois; Florida Atlantic; Delaware	W 19–7; W 28–27; W 36–24; L 0–40
2005	First Round	New Hampshire	L 21–55
2008	First Round	Villanova	L 28–55
2012	First Round	Wagner	L 20–31
2015	First Round; Second Round; Quarterfinals	New Hampshire; James Madison; Sam Houston State	W 27–20; W 44–38; L 21–48
2018	Second Round; Quarterfinals	James Madison; North Dakota State	W 23–20; L 0–35

== Notable players ==
- Frank Abruzzino – NFL player of the early 1930s
- Jamaal Branch – Former NFL running back for the New Orleans Saints (2006–2007)
- Tom Burgess – Former Canadian Football League quarterback (1986–1995) 1990 Grey Cup MVP
- Frank Castleman – Won Silver medal in 200 metre hurdles during the 1904 Summer Olympics
- Nate Eachus – Former NFL fullback for the Kansas City Chiefs (2012)
- Rich Erenberg – Former NFL running back for the Pittsburgh Steelers (1984–1986)
- Arthur Fazzin – Actor and game show host better known as Art Fleming (1942–?, transferred to Cornell)
- Dan Fortmann – Inducted into the Pro Football Hall of Fame in 1965, former NFL Guard/Linebacker for the Chicago Bears (1936–1943), 3× NFL Champion (1940, 1941 and 1943), 6× First Team All-Pro selection and 3× Pro Bowl selection
- Kenny Gamble – Former NFL running back for the Kansas City Chiefs (1988–1990). As of 2023, he is the last Colgate player to be selected during the NFL draft
- Bill Geyer – Former NFL Halfback for the Chicago Bears (1942–1943, 1946)
- Michael Joseph Hayes – First Lieutenant in the United States Army. He was killed in an attack on Saint-Juvin, France on October 14, 1918, and was posthumously awarded the Distinguished Service Cross.
- Nick Hennessey – Former NFL Offensive tackle for the Buffalo Bills (2009) and played in the Canadian Football League
- Joe Hoague – Former NFL Fullback for the Pittsburgh Steelers (1941–1942) and Boston Yanks (1946)
- Marv Hubbard – Former NFL Fullback for the Oakland Raiders (1969–1975) and 3× Pro Bowl selection
- Ellery Huntington, Jr. – Inducted into the College Football Hall of Fame in 1972
- Don Irwin – Former NFL Fullback for the Boston/Washington Redskins (1936–1939) and NFL Champion (1937)
- Matt Jaworski – Former NFL Linebacker for the Indianapolis Colts (1991) also played in the Canadian Football League for the Sacramento Goldminers (1994)
- Len Macaluso – Former professional wrestler who competed under the name "Iron Legs" Macaliso
- Greg Manusky – Former NFL linebacker for the Washington Redskins (1988–1990), Minnesota Vikings (1991–1993) and Kansas City Chiefs (1994–1999), defensive coordinator for the Redskins
- Mike Micka – Former NFL Fullback/Defensive back for the Washington Redskins (1944–1945) and Boston Yanks (1945–1948)
- Mark Murphy – Former NFL Safety for the Washington Redskins (1977–1984), Super Bowl XVII Champion, 1× Pro Bowl selection, and was the Green Bay Packers CEO and President from 2007-2025
- John Orsi – Inducted into the College Football Hall of Fame in 1982
- Eugene Robinson – Former NFL Safety for the Seattle Seahawks (1985–1995), Green Bay Packers (1996–1997), Atlanta Falcons (1998–1999) and Carolina Panthers (2000), Super Bowl XXXI Champion, 2× All-Pro selection and 3× Pro Bowl selection
- Ed Stacco – Former NFL Offensive tackle for the Detroit Lions (1947) and Washington Redskins (1948)
- Mark van Eeghen – Former NFL Running back for the Oakland Raiders (1974–1981) and New England Patriots (1982–1983)
- Ryan Vena – Former Arena Football League Quarterback.
- Ed Tryon – Inducted into the College Football Hall of Fame in 1963
- Belford West – Inducted into the College Football Hall of Fame in 1954; tackle for the Canton Bulldogs
- Izzy Yablok – NFL player of the early 1930s

== Future non-conference opponents ==
Announced schedules as of January 2, 2026.

2026	2027	2028	2029	2030
at Central Michigan	at Colorado	at Albany	at Kansas	at Maine
Cornell	at Cornell	at Syracuse		
at Harvard	Harvard	Cornell		
