= 1915–16 Army Cadets men's ice hockey season =

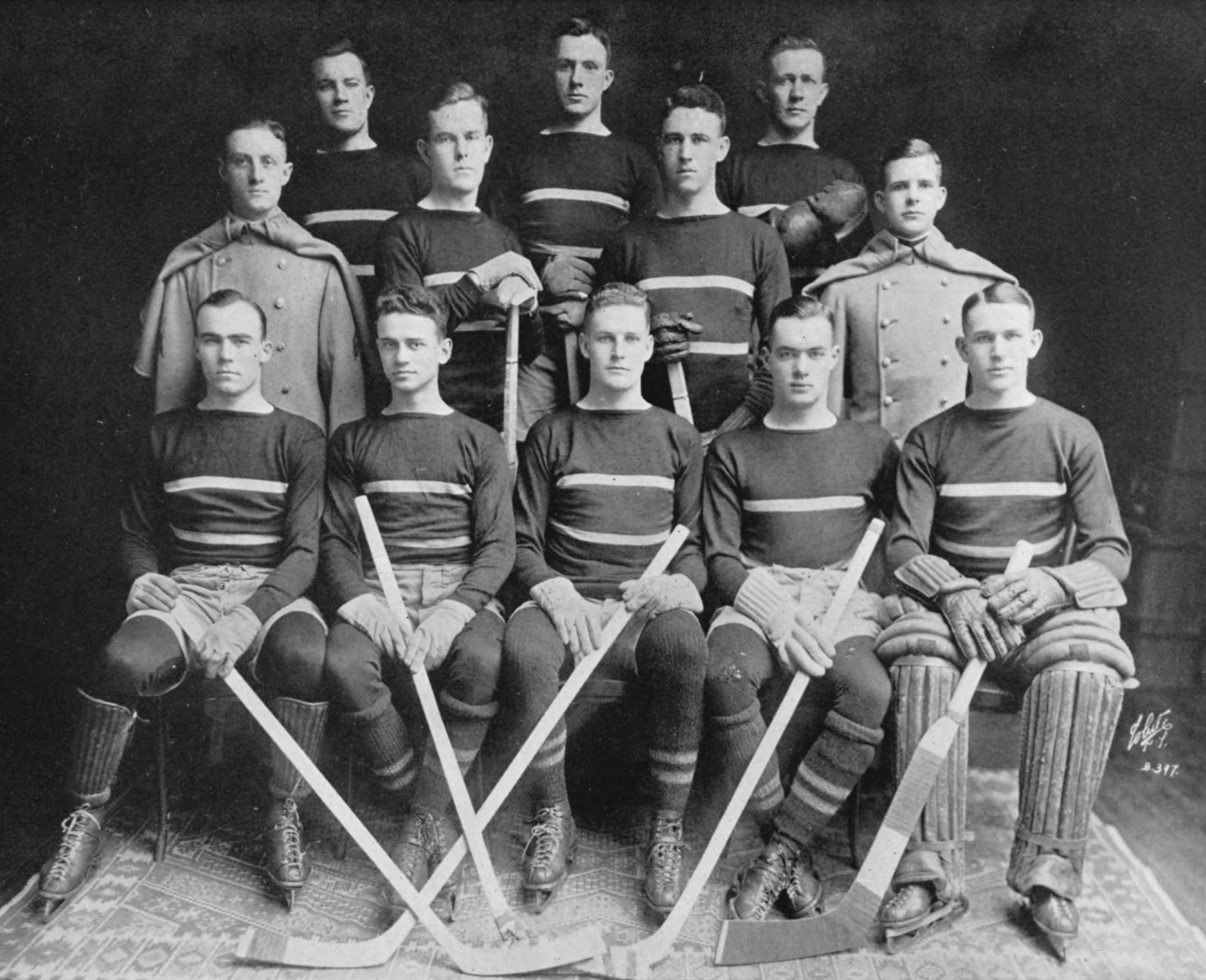
- Conference: Independent
- Home ice: Stuart Rink, Lusk Reservoir

Record
- Overall: 2–1–1

Coaches and captains
- Head coach: Frank Purdon
- Captain: Latham Brundred

The 1915–16 Army Cadets men's ice hockey season was the 13th season of play for the program.

== Roster ==
No.	Nat.	Player	Class	Pos	Height	Weight	DoB	Hometown	Previous team
	(United States)	Latham L. Brundred (C)	Senior	C			1893-10-02	Pennsylvania
	(United States)	Elbert L. Ford Jr.	Junior	R			1892-12-02	Milford, Connecticut
	(United States)	Edwin J. House	Sophomore	RW			1895-07-06	New York
	(United States)	Walter D. Mangan	Senior	LW			1892-01-30	Massachusetts
	(United States)	Felix R. McLean	Senior	D			1889-10-08	New York
	(United States)	Harlan L. Mumma	Senior	G			1894-12-06	Ohio
	(United States)	William F. Redfield	Junior	D			1894-04-21	New York

== Standings ==
1915–16 Collegiate ice hockey standings
	Intercollegiate							Overall					
	GP	W	L	T	PCT.	GF	GA	GP	W	L	T	GF	GA
Army	3	1	1	1	.500	4	10	4	2	1	1	13	11
Colgate	1	1	0	0	1.000	6	1	1	1	0	0	6	1
Cornell	2	1	1	0	.500	2	3	2	1	2	0	2	3
Dartmouth	7	4	3	0	.571	25	13	11	6	5	0	37	27
Harvard	6	6	0	0	1.000	20	2	10	8	2	0	31	12
Massachusetts Agricultural	7	3	4	0	.429	13	16	7	3	4	0	13	16
MIT	6	1	5	0	.167	6	22	8	1	6	1	8	29
New York State	–	–	–	–	–	–	–	–	–	–	–	–	–
Princeton	9	4	5	0	.444	17	21	10	5	5	0	23	24
Rensselaer	4	1	2	1	.375	9	13	4	1	2	1	9	13
Stevens Tech	–	–	–	–	–	–	–	–	–	–	–	–	–
Trinity	–	–	–	–	–	–	–	–	–	–	–	–	–
Williams	6	4	2	0	.667	22	14	6	4	2	0	22	14
Yale	12	7	5	0	.583	36	26	15	9	6	0	47	36
YMCA College	–	–	–	–	–	–	–	–	–	–	–	–	–

== Schedule and results ==
Date	Opponent	Site	Result	Record
Regular Season
	Stevens Tech*	Stuart Rink • West Point, New York	W 4–1	1–0–0
	Newburgh Athletic Club*	Stuart Rink • West Point, New York	W 9–1	2–0–0
February 8	Dartmouth*	Lusk Reservoir • West Point, New York	L 0–9	2–1–0
February 12	Rensselaer*	Lusk Reservoir • West Point, New York	T 0–0	2–1–1
*Non-conference game.
