= 1915–16 Yale Bulldogs men's ice hockey season =

College ice hockey season

- Conference: 2nd IHL
- Home ice: New Haven Arena

Record
- Overall: 9–6–0
- Conference: 2–3–0
- Home: 8–2–0
- Road: 0–1–0
- Neutral: 1–3–0

Coaches and captains
- Head coach: Gus Hornfeck
- Assistant coaches: A. C. Crowe
- Captain: Frederick Burgess

The 1915–16 Yale Bulldogs men's ice hockey season was the 21st season of play for the program.

== Season ==
In case there was any doubt as to the student body's interest in hockey, Yale had the largest number of underclassmen try out for the team at the Beginning of December. 110 men, 63 of which were freshman, attended the first tryout. The team got to work preparing for the three game series with Princeton that would open their season. After arriving in Pittsburgh, however, the Tigers were the ones who appeared ready by winning the first two games. One aspect both teams had to adjust to was the large size of the rink, far larger than either typically experienced. Yale did finally acclimate in the third game but the team knew they had work ahead of them.

Yale officially opened its intercollegiate season with decisive wins over Mass Ag. and MIT but were once more beaten by Princeton, despite a valiant effort from York in goal.

A game that was scheduled against Cornell was cancelled. Rather than lose the game time, the team had a rematch with the New Haven Arena Team and won another lopsided game. After getting shelled by the Boston Athletic Association, Yale faced Dartmouth and the two team battled intensely to a 3–3 tie after 40 minutes. The teams agreed that the first to score would be the winner but it wouldn't be until the third overtime session that Washburn tilted the scales in Yale's favor.

The first game against Harvard came next and, while the Elis were playing well, the Crimson had allowed just one goal in their previous five games combined (all wins). The trend continued as Yale was unable to solve Wylde and lost 0–2. The team rebounded in the next game, blanking Williams 5–0 for the Bulldogs' first shutout in over two years. The team was in such control of the game that they played a majority of their substitutes throughout the contest, including in goal.

Yale faced Princeton in a rematch with three of its regulars ruled ineligible. Despite the handicap, a masterful performance by York and a hat-trick from Gould gave the Elis the win 3–1 and set up a rubber match a few days later. The game was rough but clean and Yale defeated Princeton for the series win, their second victory over the Tigers in as many years. The second match with Harvard went much as the first had, however, Yale was able to score twice against Wylde, something no other college was able to do that year.

With both a coach and an assistant coach, no team manager was needed.

== Roster ==
No.	Nat.	Player	Class	Pos	Height	Weight	DoB	Hometown	Previous team
		C. Morgan Aldrich	Senior	R
	(United States)	Lester Armour	Sophomore	RW	5' 10" (1.78 m)	150 lb (68 kg)	1895-03-21	Chicago, Illinois	St. Mark's School
		John E. Bierwirth	Junior	D/RW	5' 10" (1.78 m)	165 lb (75 kg)			Hotchkiss School
	(United States)	Francis R. Blossom	Junior	R			1892-10-15	Chicago, Illinois	Hotchkiss School
	(United States)	Douglas G. Buchanan	Senior	C			1892-05-08	Pittsburgh, Pennsylvania
	(United States)	Frederick V. Burgess	Senior	R	5' 8" (1.73 m)	155 lb (70 kg)	1892-09-11	Burlington, Vermont	St. Paul's School
	(United States)	Charles D. Dickey	Senior	C	5' 10" (1.78 m)	155 lb (70 kg)	1893-12-03	New York, New York	St. Paul's School
	(United States)	Erl C. B. Gould	Sophomore	R/LW	5' 10" (1.78 m)	150 lb (68 kg)	1895-10-03	Baltimore, Maryland	St. Paul's School
		Everett Griggs	Sophomore	C/LW			1891-05-08
		Henry R. Heebner	Sophomore	R			1896-11-08
		Walter P. Jacob	Junior	R/LW			1896-03-01
		Lawrence N. Murray	Junior	D	5' 11" (1.8 m)	160 lb (73 kg)			St. Paul's School
	(United States)	Willis O. Preston	Sophomore	LW			1893-04-28	Pittsburgh, Pennsylvania
		Henry H. Scudder	Sophomore	G
		Howell Van Nostrand	Sophomore	R/C/RW	5' 10" (1.78 m)	156 lb (71 kg)			Westminster School
		Ira H. Washburn	Senior	D					St. Paul's School
	(United States)	Holcomb York	Junior	G	5' 10" (1.78 m)	160 lb (73 kg)	1895-05-04	New Haven, Connecticut	Hotchkiss School

== Standings ==
1915–16 Collegiate ice hockey standings
	Intercollegiate							Overall					
	GP	W	L	T	PCT.	GF	GA	GP	W	L	T	GF	GA
Army	3	1	1	1	.500	4	10	4	2	1	1	13	11
Colgate	1	1	0	0	1.000	6	1	1	1	0	0	6	1
Cornell	2	1	1	0	.500	2	3	2	1	2	0	2	3
Dartmouth	7	4	3	0	.571	25	13	11	6	5	0	37	27
Harvard	6	6	0	0	1.000	20	2	10	8	2	0	31	12
Massachusetts Agricultural	7	3	4	0	.429	13	16	7	3	4	0	13	16
MIT	6	1	5	0	.167	6	22	8	1	6	1	8	29
New York State	–	–	–	–	–	–	–	–	–	–	–	–	–
Princeton	9	4	5	0	.444	17	21	10	5	5	0	23	24
Rensselaer	4	1	2	1	.375	9	13	4	1	2	1	9	13
Stevens Tech	–	–	–	–	–	–	–	–	–	–	–	–	–
Trinity	–	–	–	–	–	–	–	–	–	–	–	–	–
Williams	6	4	2	0	.667	22	14	6	4	2	0	22	14
Yale	12	7	5	0	.583	36	26	15	9	6	0	47	36
YMCA College	–	–	–	–	–	–	–	–	–	–	–	–	–

1915–16 Intercollegiate Hockey League standings
	Conference								Overall					
	GP	W	L	T	PTS	SW	GF	GA	GP	W	L	T	GF	GA
Harvard *	4	4	0	0	1.000	2	11	2	10	8	2	0	31	12
Yale	5	2	3	0	.400	1	12	12	15	9	6	0	47	36
Princeton	5	1	4	0	.200	0	6	15	10	5	5	0	23	24
* indicates conference champion

== Schedule and results ==
Date	Opponent	Site	Result	Record
Regular season
December 15	vs. New Haven Arena Club*	New Haven Arena • New Haven, Connecticut (Exhibition)	W 12–3	
December 28	vs. Princeton*	Winter Garden Rink • Pittsburgh, Pennsylvania	L 2–5	0–1–0
December 29	vs. Princeton*	Winter Garden Rink • Pittsburgh, Pennsylvania	L 0–2	0–2–0
December 30	vs. Princeton*	Winter Garden Rink • Pittsburgh, Pennsylvania	W 3–1	1–2–0
January 12	Massachusetts Agricultural*	New Haven Arena • New Haven, Connecticut	W 5–1	2–2–0
January 15	MIT*	New Haven Arena • New Haven, Connecticut	W 5–2	3–2–0
January 19	vs. Princeton	St. Nicholas Rink • New York, New York	L 1–2	3–3–0 (0–1–0)
January 22	Crescent Athletic Club*	New Haven Arena • New Haven, Connecticut	W 4–3	4–3–0
January 26	vs. New Haven Arena Club*	New Haven Arena • New Haven, Connecticut	W 6–1	5–3–0
January 29	Boston Athletic Association*	New Haven Arena • New Haven, Connecticut	L 1–6	5–4–0
February 7	Dartmouth*	New Haven Arena • New Haven, Connecticut	W 4–3 ^{3OT}	6–4–0
February 12	at Harvard	Boston Arena • Boston, Massachusetts (Rivalry)	L 0–2	6–5–0 (0–2–0)
February 16	Williams*	New Haven Arena • New Haven, Connecticut	W 5–0	7–5–0
February 19	Princeton	New Haven Arena • New Haven, Connecticut	W 3–1	8–5–0 (1–2–0)
February 23	Princeton	New Haven Arena • New Haven, Connecticut	W 6–3	9–5–0 (2–2–0)
February 26	Harvard	New Haven Arena • New Haven, Connecticut (Rivalry)	L 2–4	9–6–0 (2–3–0)
*Non-conference game.
