= 1915–16 Williams Ephs men's ice hockey season =

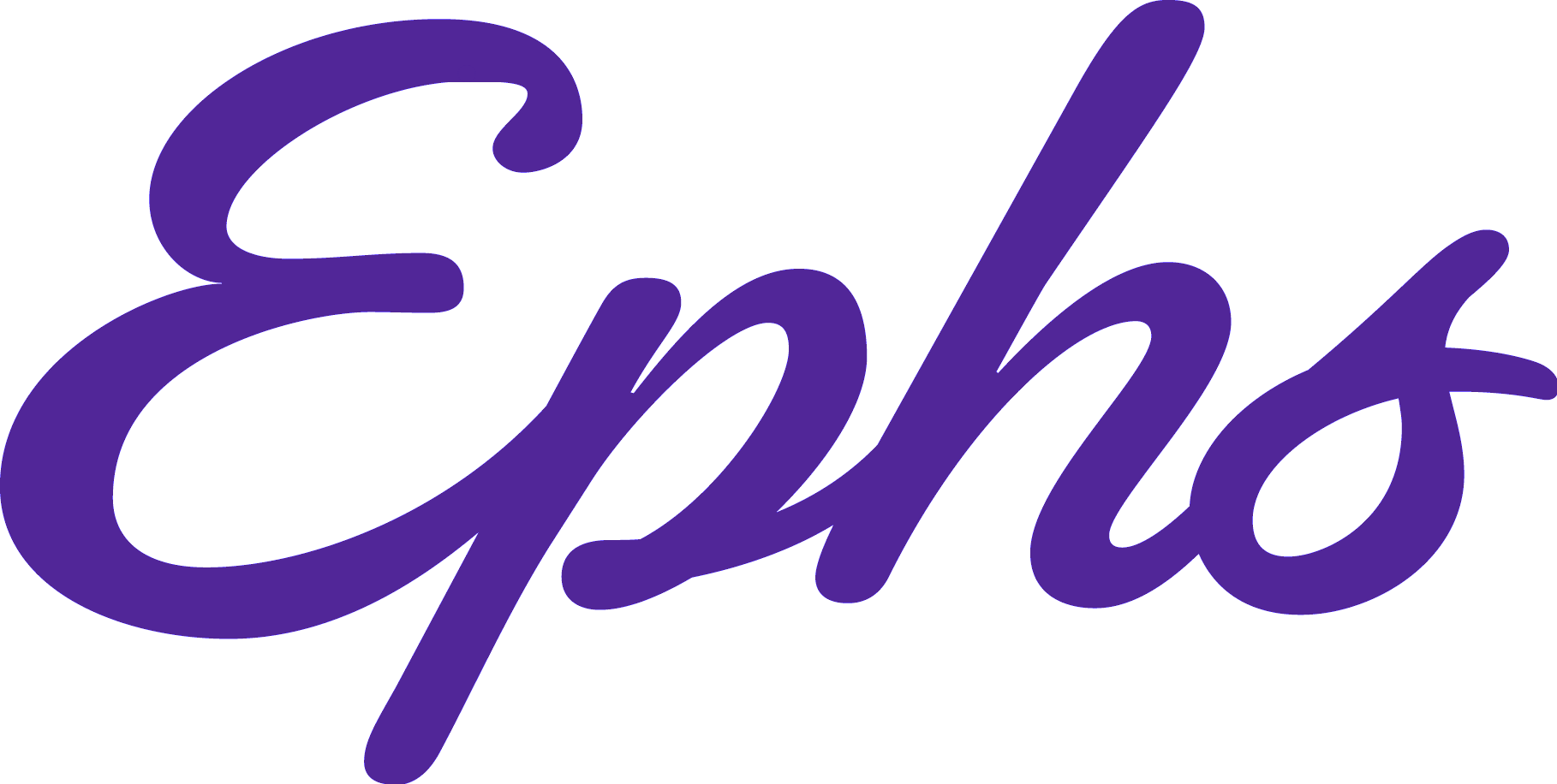
- Home ice: Cole Field House Pond

Record
- Overall: 4–2–0
- Home: 4–0–0
- Road: 0–2–0

Coaches and captains
- Captain: Douglas Coleman

The 1915–16 Williams Ephs men's ice hockey season was the 13th season of play for the program.

== Roster ==
No.	Nat.	Player	Class	Pos	Height	Weight	DoB	Hometown	Previous team
		Brown	Freshman	D
		Douglas R. Coleman (C)	Senior	D
		Leighton H. Coleman	Sophomore	C
		Homer Collins Jr.	Freshman	RW
		W. Gordon Hegardt	Freshman	R
		Michler	Graduate	G
		Thomas F. Rochester	Junior	LW

† Munchler and Michler were alternatively reported as playing goal for Williams, however, no one with either name appears to have attended Williams at the time.

== Standings ==
1915–16 Collegiate ice hockey standings
	Intercollegiate							Overall					
	GP	W	L	T	PCT.	GF	GA	GP	W	L	T	GF	GA
Army	3	1	1	1	.500	4	10	4	2	1	1	13	11
Colgate	1	1	0	0	1.000	6	1	1	1	0	0	6	1
Cornell	2	1	1	0	.500	2	3	2	1	2	0	2	3
Dartmouth	7	4	3	0	.571	25	13	11	6	5	0	37	27
Harvard	6	6	0	0	1.000	20	2	10	8	2	0	31	12
Massachusetts Agricultural	7	3	4	0	.429	13	16	7	3	4	0	13	16
MIT	6	1	5	0	.167	6	22	8	1	6	1	8	29
New York State	–	–	–	–	–	–	–	–	–	–	–	–	–
Princeton	9	4	5	0	.444	17	21	10	5	5	0	23	24
Rensselaer	4	1	2	1	.375	9	13	4	1	2	1	9	13
Stevens Tech	–	–	–	–	–	–	–	–	–	–	–	–	–
Trinity	–	–	–	–	–	–	–	–	–	–	–	–	–
Williams	6	4	2	0	.667	22	14	6	4	2	0	22	14
Yale	12	7	5	0	.583	36	26	15	9	6	0	47	36
YMCA College	–	–	–	–	–	–	–	–	–	–	–	–	–

== Schedule and results ==
Date	Opponent	Site	Result	Record
Regular Season
January 8	Rensselaer*	Weston Field Rink • Williamstown, Massachusetts	W 7–1	1–0–0
January 15	YMCA College*	Weston Field Rink • Williamstown, Massachusetts	W 5–2	2–0–0
February 12	MIT*	Weston Field Rink • Williamstown, Massachusetts	W 7–2	3–0–0
February 16	at Yale*	New Haven Arena • New Haven, Connecticut	L 0–5	3–1–0
February 17	at Massachusetts Agricultural*	Alumni Field Rink • Amherst, Massachusetts	L 1–3	3–2–0
February 23	Massachusetts Agricultural*	Weston Field Rink • Williamstown, Massachusetts	W 2–1	4–2–0
*Non-conference game.
