= 1915–16 RPI men's ice hockey season =

- Conference: Independent

Record
- Overall: 1–2–1
- Home: 1–0–0
- Road: 0–2–1

Coaches and captains
- Captain: Donald Patterson

The 1915–16 RPI men's ice hockey season was the 13th season of play for the program.

== Season ==
Rensselaer ended the team's losing streak at 9 games and later earned the first win for the program in over four years.

Note: Rensselaer's athletic teams were unofficially known as 'Cherry and White' until 1921 when the Engineers moniker debuted for the men's basketball team.

== Roster ==
No.	Nat.	Player	Class	Pos	Height	Weight	DoB	Hometown	Previous team
		Donald Patterson (C)

== Standings ==
1915–16 Collegiate ice hockey standings
	Intercollegiate							Overall					
	GP	W	L	T	PCT.	GF	GA	GP	W	L	T	GF	GA
Army	3	1	1	1	.500	4	10	4	2	1	1	13	11
Colgate	1	1	0	0	1.000	6	1	1	1	0	0	6	1
Cornell	2	1	1	0	.500	2	3	2	1	2	0	2	3
Dartmouth	7	4	3	0	.571	25	13	11	6	5	0	37	27
Harvard	6	6	0	0	1.000	20	2	10	8	2	0	31	12
Massachusetts Agricultural	7	3	4	0	.429	13	16	7	3	4	0	13	16
MIT	6	1	5	0	.167	6	22	8	1	6	1	8	29
New York State	–	–	–	–	–	–	–	–	–	–	–	–	–
Princeton	9	4	5	0	.444	17	21	10	5	5	0	23	24
Rensselaer	4	1	2	1	.375	9	13	4	1	2	1	9	13
Stevens Tech	–	–	–	–	–	–	–	–	–	–	–	–	–
Trinity	–	–	–	–	–	–	–	–	–	–	–	–	–
Williams	6	4	2	0	.667	22	14	6	4	2	0	22	14
Yale	12	7	5	0	.583	36	26	15	9	6	0	47	36
YMCA College	–	–	–	–	–	–	–	–	–	–	–	–	–

== Schedule and results ==
Date	Opponent	Site	Result	Record
Regular Season
January 8	at Williams*	Weston Field Rink • Williamstown, Massachusetts	L 1–7	0–1–0
February 12	at Army*	Lusk Reservoir • West Point, New York	T 0–0 ^{OT}	0–1–1
February 19	at Colgate*	Hamilton, New York	L 1–6	0–2–1
February 26	New York State*	Troy, New York	W 7–0	1–2–1
*Non-conference game.
