= 1915–16 Dartmouth men's ice hockey season =

- Conference: Independent
- Home ice: Occom Pond

Record
- Overall: 6–5–0
- Home: 2–0–0
- Road: 3–4–0
- Neutral: 1–1–0

Coaches and captains
- Head coach: Clarence Wanamaker
- Captain: Carl Holmes

The 1915–16 Dartmouth men's ice hockey season was the 11th season of play for the program.

== Season ==
Dartmouth began their first season under Clarence Wanamaker (class of 1915) well, winning their first three intercollegiate games by shutting out their opponents. The team didn't appear to have lost a step from the squad that had narrowly missed winning a championship the year before, but when they hit the meat of their schedule the team fared poorly.

The Greens lost a close decision to Princeton in mid January then had over three weeks before their next contest. When they played Harvard they were in no shape to face the defending champions and lost badly. They found their legs in the next game against Yale, keeping even with the Elis deep into overtime, but the Bulldogs scored the game winner, relegating Dartmouth to second class status for the year.

The Greens won their final three games, including a route of Army, to finish with a winning record but the mid-season stumble left the team with a sour taste in its mouth.

Note: Dartmouth College did not possess a moniker for its athletic teams until the 1920s, however, the university had adopted 'Dartmouth Green' as its school color in 1866.

== Roster ==
No.	Nat.	Player	Class	Pos	Height	Weight	DoB	Hometown	Previous team
	(United States)	George C. Currier	Junior	D			1895-09-21	Arlington, Massachusetts
	(United States)	Samuel E. Cutler		F			1892-07-12	Somerville, Massachusetts
	(United States)	Lewis H. Cousens	Sophomore	D			1894-04-05	Arlington, Massachusetts	Arlington Catholic
	(United States)	Burton L. Gale Jr.	Junior	RW			1894-12-05	Warren, Pennsylvania
	(United States)	Pierce G. Geran	Sophomore	C	5' 9" (1.75 m)	179 lb (81 kg)	1896-08-03	Holyoke, Massachusetts
	(United States)	John C. Geran	Senior				1894-08-06	Holyoke, Massachusetts
	(United States)	Carl N. Holmes (C)	Senior	LW				Somerville, Massachusetts
	(United States)	Harris F. Murchie	Senior	D				Maine
	(United States)	Gerald V. Rector	Senior	F			1893-09-04	Tobias, Nebraska
	(United States)	Wendell G. Reycroft	Junior	C			1894-05-11	Arlington, Massachusetts	Arlington High School
	(United States)	Donald B. Scully	Sophomore	G				Arlington, Massachusetts
	(United States)	Ralph Tyler	Junior	F				Exeter, New Hampshire

== Standings ==
1915–16 Collegiate ice hockey standings
	Intercollegiate							Overall					
	GP	W	L	T	PCT.	GF	GA	GP	W	L	T	GF	GA
Army	3	1	1	1	.500	4	10	4	2	1	1	13	11
Colgate	1	1	0	0	1.000	6	1	1	1	0	0	6	1
Cornell	2	1	1	0	.500	2	3	2	1	2	0	2	3
Dartmouth	7	4	3	0	.571	25	13	11	6	5	0	37	27
Harvard	6	6	0	0	1.000	20	2	10	8	2	0	31	12
Massachusetts Agricultural	7	3	4	0	.429	13	16	7	3	4	0	13	16
MIT	6	1	5	0	.167	6	22	8	1	6	1	8	29
New York State	–	–	–	–	–	–	–	–	–	–	–	–	–
Princeton	9	4	5	0	.444	17	21	10	5	5	0	23	24
Rensselaer	4	1	2	1	.375	9	13	4	1	2	1	9	13
Stevens Tech	–	–	–	–	–	–	–	–	–	–	–	–	–
Trinity	–	–	–	–	–	–	–	–	–	–	–	–	–
Williams	6	4	2	0	.667	22	14	6	4	2	0	22	14
Yale	12	7	5	0	.583	36	26	15	9	6	0	47	36
YMCA College	–	–	–	–	–	–	–	–	–	–	–	–	–

== Schedule and results ==
Date	Opponent	Site	Result	Record
Regular Season
December 21	at MIT*	Boston Arena • Boston, Massachusetts	W 6–0	1–0–0
December 25	at Boston Arena Club*	Boston Arena • Boston, Massachusetts	L 1–2	1–1–0
December 29	vs. Massachusetts Agricultural*	Boston Arena • Boston, Massachusetts	W 4–0	2–1–0
January 1	at Boston Athletic Association*	Boston Arena • Boston, Massachusetts	L 0–4	2–2–0
January 8	MIT*	Occom Pond • Hanover, New Hampshire	W 2–0	3–2–0
January 12	vs. Princeton*	St. Nicholas Rink • New York, New York	L 1–3	3–3–0
February 4	at Harvard*	Boston Arena • Boston, Massachusetts	L 0–6	3–4–0
February 7	at Yale*	New Haven Arena • New Haven, Connecticut	L 3–4 ^{3OT}	3–5–0
February 8	at Army*	Lusk Reservoir • West Point, New York	W 9–0	4–5–0
February 11	Bishop's*	Occom Pond • Hanover, New Hampshire	W 3–2 ^{OT}	5–5–0
February 22	at St. Paul's School*	St. Paul's Rink • Concord, New Hampshire	W 8–6	6–5–0
*Non-conference game.
