= George A. Percy =

George Almy Percy
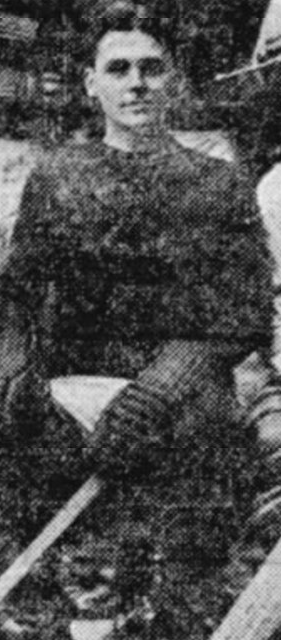
- Percy from the 1920–1921 Boston Athletic Association hockey team photo
- Born: May 2, 1895; Arlington, Massachusetts, US
- Died: January 10, 1970 (aged 74); Amityville, New York, US
- Military career
- Allegiance: United States of America
- Branch: United States Marine Corps
- Service years: 1917–1958
- Rank: Lieutenant colonel
- Nickname: Harvard Hercules
- Service number: 0-3106
- Conflicts: World War II: Battle of Iwo Jima
- Awards: Navy Cross
Ice hockey career
- Height: 5 ft 8 in (173 cm)
- Weight: 160 lb (73 kg; 11 st 6 lb)
- Position: Forward
- Played for: Harvard University; Harvard Club; Boston A.A. Boston Hockey Club
- Playing career: 1914–1924

George Almy Percy (May 2, 1895 – January 10, 1970) was an American ice hockey player and United States Marine Corps officer who played for the Harvard and Boston Athletic Association ice hockey teams and was a recipient of the Navy Cross for his actions during the Battle of Iwo Jima.

== Early life ==
Percy was born on May 2, 1895, in Arlington, Massachusetts to David Thomas and Maude (Almy) Percy. Percy attended Arlington High School and Phillips Exeter Academy. He played hockey and baseball at Phillips Exeter and was elected captain of the hockey team for the 1914–15 season, but instead enrolled in Harvard College.

== Harvard ==
Percy entered Harvard College in 1914 and was elected captain of the freshman hockey team. In 1915, he won a strength competition against his fellow Crimson athletes, which resulted being nicknamed the "Harvard Hercules". He played on the varsity hockey team during the 1915–16 and 1916–17 and led the team in goals both years. Percy also played for the Harvard Crimson baseball team. He was elected captain of the hockey team for the 1917–18 season, but the team was suspended for the year due to World War I.

== World War I ==
On June 1, 1917, Percy took a special examination to qualify for a commission in the United States Marine Corps. On July 16, he passed the physical examination and was enrolled with the temporary rank of second lieutenant. He received his permanent rank on July 29. He was stationed at Marine Corps Base Quantico until November 1917, when he was moved to Fort Sill, where he was a reconnaissance officer with the field artillery. In May 1918, he returned to Harvard as a recruiting officer.

== Amateur hockey ==
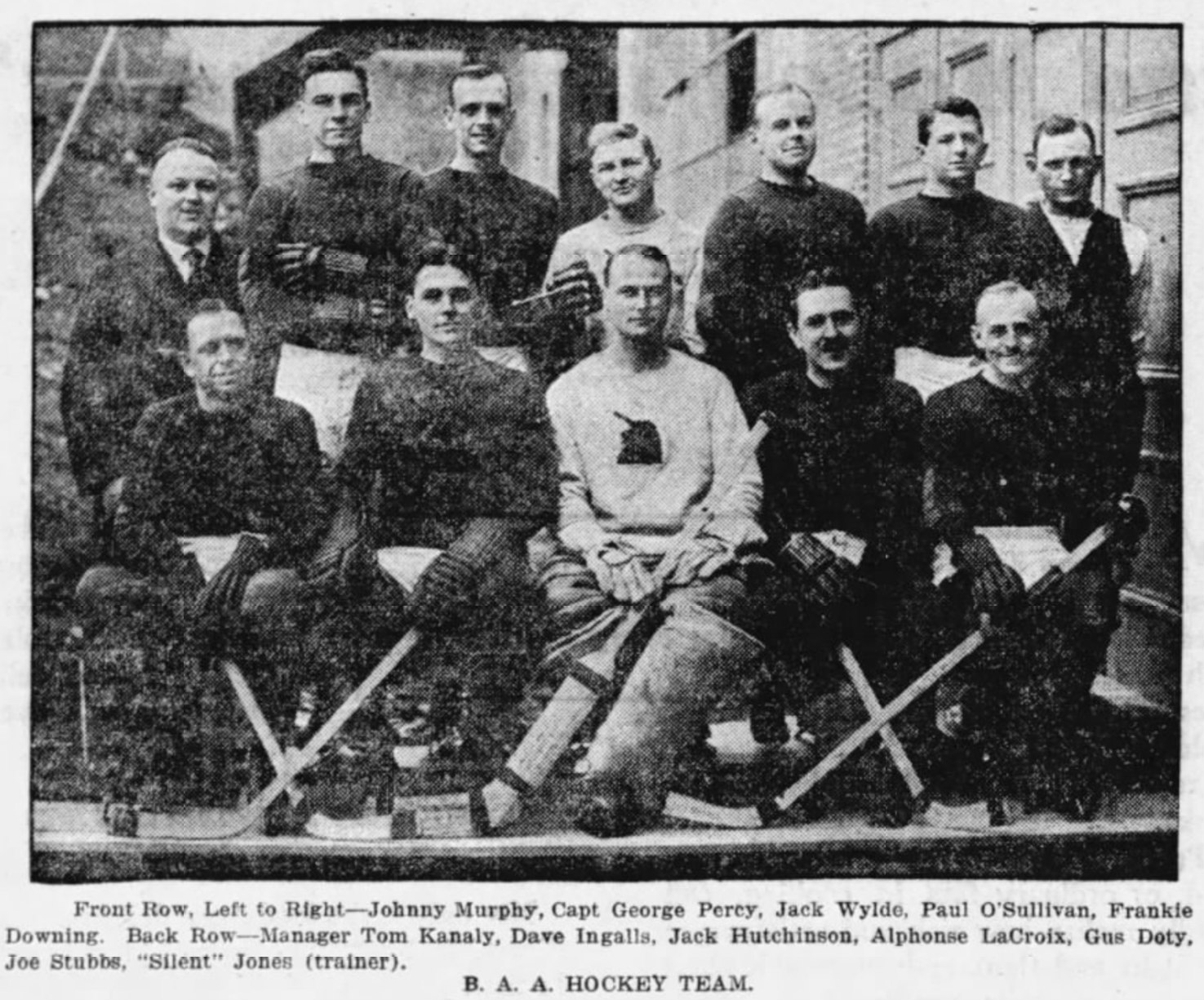
1920–21 Boston Athletic Association hockey team

Percy played for the Harvard Club during the 1919–20 season. The team folded after the season and Percy and three of his teammates signed with the Boston Athletic Association. Percy played for the B.A.A. from 1920 to 1922 and served as captain of the 1920–21 Boston Athletic Association hockey team. From 1922 to 1924, Percy played right wing for the Boston Hockey Club.

== Personal life ==
On June 22, 1918, Percy married Hallie Elkins Davis, the granddaughter of former United States Senator Henry G. Davis and a Washington D.C. socialite he met while stationed at Quantico. They had one son. On February 11, 1926, she was granted a divorce decree in Paris on the grounds that Percy had left their domicile.

On April 14, 1930, Percy married Elvia Enders, a stage actress who played Madge Ferris in Little Accident, after knowing each other for six weeks. They had two sons. In 1938, Percy leased an 11-room suite at 1040 Park Avenue in New York City. He later moved to 200 East 66th Street. On November 7, 1941, Elvia Percy received a divorce in Reno, Nevada on the charge of cruelty.

Percy's final marriage was to Margaret Beauchamp. They had one son.

== World War II ==
Percy served in the United States Marine Corps from 1942 to 1945. He was the executive officer of the 2nd Battalion, 21st Marine Regiment at the start of the Battle of Iwo Jima. When his commanding officer, Lowell E. English, was wounded on March 2, 1945, Percy took over as commanding officer. His arm was severely wounded during an attack on March 8, but he refused to leave the field. He was wounded a second time that afternoon and again chose to remain with his troops. He led his force in an attack which ended on the cliffs overlooking the sea. On November 22, 1948, Percy was awarded the Navy Cross for extraordinary heroism during the Battle of Iwo Jima. Percy left the Marines with the rank of Lieutenant colonel. He then served in the United States Marine Corps Reserve until 1958, retiring with the rank of Colonel.

== Business career ==
After World War I, Percy worked for Lee, Higginson & Co. In 1925, he became a European representative for the bank. He later worked for Clark Dodge & Co., where he retired as a vice president and director. In 1958, he was elected to the American Museum of Natural History's board of trustees.

Percy died on January 10, 1970, at Brunswick Hospital in Amityville, New York.
