= 1915–16 Harvard Crimson men's ice hockey season =

College ice hockey season

Intercollegiate Champion Intercollegiate Hockey League, Champion
- Conference: 1st IHL
- Home ice: Boston Arena

Record
- Overall: 8–2–0
- Conference: 4–0–0
- Home: 6–2–0
- Road: 1–0–0
- Neutral: 1–0–0

Coaches and captains
- Head coach: Alfred Winsor
- Captain: John Morgan

The 1915–16 Harvard Crimson men's ice hockey season was the 19th season of play for the program.

== Season ==
Before the season began, former members of the old Intercollegiate Hockey Association (Cornell and Dartmouth) agreed to join the then current Intercollegiate Hockey League. Instead of playing a best-of-three series against all members, the new squads would only play their conference opponents once during the season.

Harvard began their title defense with a tune-up game against the Boston Athletic Association just before the winter break. After returning the Crimson faced Queen's and lost a close match to their Canadian opponents. The result of the game was secondary to the response from the crowd and an appeal to the Harvard faithful was made to show up in force to the remaining contests.

In their next game against Cornell the offense played rather poorly, with many scoring opportunities failing to the wayside. The team's defense, however, was in its typical stout form. Though the Big Red were hamstrung by a lack of practice, Harvard didn't give the Ithacans any chance and shut out Cornell for their first win of the season. The next game against a stronger Princeton squad and Harvard had to weather a barrage from the Tigers early in the game, but Wylde and the defense turned everything aside. In the second half Princeton got into penalty trouble, allowing the Crimson to score three times with the man-advantage and take the contest 3–0.

The rematch with Princeton one week later turned into a goaltending dual between Ford and Wylde. The two netminders kept their opponents scoreless through forty minutes of regulation and caused a pair of 5-minute overtimes to be used. Halfway through the first extra session George A. Percy finally scored the first goal of the game to give Harvard the lead. Despite a furious pushback, Princeton was unable to solve Wylde and a further Crimson goal in the second overtime gave Harvard the series win over Princeton.

Harvard's three-game shutout streak was finally ended by McGill at the end of the month, but the Crimson were still able to win the match and head into the second half of their season with an excellent chance at winning a championship. In the match against Dartmouth, Harvard continued the season-long shutout against fellow universities and entered the series against Yale just two wins away from the intercollegiate championship. In the initial game Harvard used six substitutions and 13 saves from Wylde to tally its fifth shutout of the season.

Before the rematch with the Elis, Harvard earned a somewhat surprising victory over the St. Nicholas Hockey Club who were led by Hobey Baker. The team speed, particularly from Percy, and the overall defensive effort allowed Harvard to keep their opponents at bay for most of the game and respond when their foes did manage to score. The second game from Yale saw the Crimson receive a better fight that they had all year, with the Bulldogs scoring twice to end Harvard's pursuit of a perfect defensive campaign against intercollegiate competition. Yale scored first in each of the two half but Harvard responded both times with a pair of goals and Harvard skated to a series sweep against the Elis, a perfect record into intercollegiate matches and their second consecutive intercollegiate championship.

John Wylde's 5 shutouts on the season was a program record (tied) for 89 years while his 1.50 goals against average was one of the best results for a Crimson netminder.

== Roster ==
No.	Nat.	Player	Class	Pos	Height	Weight	DoB	Hometown	Previous team
	(United States)	Edwin O. Baker	Junior	C/LW			1896-02-21	Cambridge, Massachusetts	Cambridge Latin School
	(United States)	Robert Baldwin	Junior	C/RW			1895-04-09	Wellesley Hills, Massachusetts	Volkmann School
	(United States)	Henry M. Bliss	Junior	RW			1895-06-11	Chestnut Hill, Massachusetts	Volkmann School
	(United States)	Clarence S. Clark	Senior	D		165 lb (75 kg)	1893-02-11	Germantown, Pennsylvania	Milton Academy
	(United States)	Laurence Curtis II	Senior	C		172 lb (78 kg)	1893-09-03	Boston, Massachusetts	Groton School
	(United States)	Augustus Doty	Senior	D		193 lb (88 kg)	1894-01-20	Waltham, Massachusetts	St. Paul's School
	(United States)	Thomas Eckfeldt	Junior	D			1896-01-28	New Bedford, Massachusetts	St. Andrew's School
	(United States)	Thomas K. Fisher	Junior	RW			1894-01-11	Clinton, Massachusetts	St. Paul's School
	(United States)	Lawrence M. Lombard	Junior	RW			1895-05-23	Winchester, Massachusetts	Milton Academy
	(United States)	John E. P. Morgan (C)	Junior	D			1895-08-09	Lenox, Massachusetts	Middlesex School
	(United States)	William O. P. Morgan	Sophomore	D			1895-05-14	Chicago, Illinois	St. Paul's School
	(United States)	George A. Percy	Sophomore	C			1895-05-12	Arlington, Massachusetts	Arlington High School
	(United States)	Theodore H. Rice	Sophomore	LW			1894-05-24	Dorchester, Massachusetts	Noble and Greenough School
	(United States)	Moseley Taylor	Sophomore				1895-01-30	Boston, Massachusetts	Phillips Academy
	(United States)	Thomas C. Thatcher Jr.	Sophomore	RW			1896-08-12	Nahant, Massachusetts	St. Mark's School
	(United States)	John Wylde	Junior	G			1893-08-26	Jamaica Plain, Massachusetts	Noble and Greenough School

== Standings ==
1915–16 collegiate ice hockey standings
	Intercollegiate							Overall					
	GP	W	L	T	PCT.	GF	GA	GP	W	L	T	GF	GA
Army	3	1	1	1	.500	4	10	4	2	1	1	13	11
Colgate	1	1	0	0	1.000	6	1	1	1	0	0	6	1
Cornell	2	1	1	0	.500	2	3	2	1	2	0	2	3
Dartmouth	7	4	3	0	.571	25	13	11	6	5	0	37	27
Harvard	6	6	0	0	1.000	20	2	10	8	2	0	31	12
Massachusetts Agricultural	7	3	4	0	.429	13	16	7	3	4	0	13	16
MIT	6	1	5	0	.167	6	22	8	1	6	1	8	29
New York State	–	–	–	–	–	–	–	–	–	–	–	–	–
Princeton	9	4	5	0	.444	17	21	10	5	5	0	23	24
Rensselaer	4	1	2	1	.375	9	13	4	1	2	1	9	13
Stevens Tech	–	–	–	–	–	–	–	–	–	–	–	–	–
Trinity	–	–	–	–	–	–	–	–	–	–	–	–	–
Williams	6	4	2	0	.667	22	14	6	4	2	0	22	14
Yale	12	7	5	0	.583	36	26	15	9	6	0	47	36
YMCA College	–	–	–	–	–	–	–	–	–	–	–	–	–

1915–16 Intercollegiate Hockey League standings
	Conference								Overall					
	GP	W	L	T	PTS	SW	GF	GA	GP	W	L	T	GF	GA
Harvard *	4	4	0	0	1.000	2	11	2	10	8	2	0	31	12
Yale	5	2	3	0	.400	1	12	12	15	9	6	0	47	36
Princeton	5	1	4	0	.200	0	6	15	10	5	5	0	23	24
* indicates conference champion

== Schedule and results ==
Date	Opponent	Site	Result	Record
Regular Season
December 18	vs. Boston Athletic Association*	Boston Arena • Boston, Massachusetts	L 1–3	0–1–0
January 8	Queen's*	Boston Arena • Boston, Massachusetts	L 3–4	0–2–0
January 11	Cornell*	Boston Arena • Boston, Massachusetts	W 2–0	1–2–0
January 15	Princeton	Boston Arena • Boston, Massachusetts	W 3–0	2–2–0 (1–0–0)
January 22	vs. Princeton	St. Nicholas Rink • New York, New York	W 2–0	3–2–0 (2–0–0)
January 29	McGill*	Boston Arena • Boston, Massachusetts	W 4–1	4–2–0
February 4	Dartmouth*	Boston Arena • Boston, Massachusetts	W 6–0	5–2–0
February 12	Yale	Boston Arena • Boston, Massachusetts (Rivalry)	W 2–0	6–2–0 (3–0–0)
February 19	St. Nicholas Hockey Club*	Boston Arena • Boston, Massachusetts	W 4–2	7–2–0
February 26	at Yale	New Haven Arena • New Haven, Connecticut (Rivalry)	W 4–2	8–2–0 (4–0–0)
*Non-conference game.
