= 1915–16 MIT Engineers men's ice hockey season =

- Conference: Independent
- Home ice: Boston Arena

Record
- Overall: 1–6–1
- Home: 1–2–0
- Road: 0–4–1

Coaches and captains
- Captain: Clarence Cochrane

The 1915–16 MIT Engineers men's ice hockey season was the 17th season of play for the program.

== Season ==
The team did not have a head coach but Irving W. Young served as team manager.

Note: Massachusetts Institute of Technology athletics were referred to as 'Engineers' or 'Techmen' during the first two decades of the 20th century. By 1920 all sports programs had adopted the Engineer moniker.

== Roster ==
No.	Nat.	Player	Class	Pos	Height	Weight	DoB	Hometown	Previous team
	(United States)	Waldo B. Clark	Freshman	RW			1897-11-12	Belmont, Massachusetts	Somerville High School
		Clarence Cochrane (C)	Junior	R
		Gardner E. Johnson	Sophomore	G			1895-03-02
	(United States)	Harold Y. Keeler	Junior	LW			1896-04-19	Ridgefield, Connecticut
	(United States)	Robert B. Swain	Junior	D			1893-03-24	Providence, Rhode Island
	(United States)	Carl E. Thomas	Freshman	LW			1897-10-21	Waverley, Massachusetts	Belmont High School
	(United States)	Chester R. Tutein	Sophomore	C			1895-05-17	Revere, Massachusetts
		Elmer M. Wanamaker	Senior	C
	(United States)	John B. Woodward	Sophomore	D			1892-04-18	Albany, New York

== Standings ==
1915–16 collegiate ice hockey standings
	Intercollegiate							Overall					
	GP	W	L	T	PCT.	GF	GA	GP	W	L	T	GF	GA
Army	3	1	1	1	.500	4	10	4	2	1	1	13	11
Colgate	1	1	0	0	1.000	6	1	1	1	0	0	6	1
Cornell	2	1	1	0	.500	2	3	2	1	2	0	2	3
Dartmouth	7	4	3	0	.571	25	13	11	6	5	0	37	27
Harvard	6	6	0	0	1.000	20	2	10	8	2	0	31	12
Massachusetts Agricultural	7	3	4	0	.429	13	16	7	3	4	0	13	16
MIT	6	1	5	0	.167	6	22	8	1	6	1	8	29
New York State	–	–	–	–	–	–	–	–	–	–	–	–	–
Princeton	9	4	5	0	.444	17	21	10	5	5	0	23	24
Rensselaer	4	1	2	1	.375	9	13	4	1	2	1	9	13
Stevens Tech	–	–	–	–	–	–	–	–	–	–	–	–	–
Trinity	–	–	–	–	–	–	–	–	–	–	–	–	–
Williams	6	4	2	0	.667	22	14	6	4	2	0	22	14
Yale	12	7	5	0	.583	36	26	15	9	6	0	47	36
YMCA College	–	–	–	–	–	–	–	–	–	–	–	–	–

== Schedule and results ==
Date	Opponent	Site	Result	Record
Regular Season
December 12	at Winchester Hockey Club*	Winchester, Massachusetts	T 0–0	0–0–1
December 21	vs. Dartmouth*	Boston Arena • Boston, Massachusetts	L 0–6	0–1–1
December 31	Massachusetts Agricultural*	Boston Arena • Boston, Massachusetts	W 1–0	1–1–1
January 8	at Dartmouth*	Occom Pond • Hanover, New Hampshire	L 0–2	1–2–1
January 12	Cornell*	Boston Arena • Boston, Massachusetts	L 1–2	1–3–1
January 15	at Yale*	New Haven Arena • New Haven, Connecticut	L 2–5	1–4–1
February 12	at Williams*	Weston Field Rink • Williamstown, Massachusetts	L 2–7	1–5–1
February 22	at Philips Exeter Academy*	Exeter, New Hampshire	L 2–7	1–6–1
*Non-conference game.
