= 1915–16 Princeton Tigers men's ice hockey season =

College ice hockey season

- Conference: 3rd IHL
- Home ice: Lake Carnegie

Record
- Overall: 5–5–0
- Conference: 1–4–0
- Road: 1–3–0
- Neutral: 4–2–0

Coaches and captains
- Captain: Grant Peacock

The 1915–16 Princeton Tigers men's ice hockey season was the 17th season of play for the program.

== Season ==
With many returning members, including team captain Grant Peacock, Princeton had high hoped for their season. Before it even began, however, the team received unwelcome news when the operators of the St. Nicholas Rink, still the principle arena for the university's teams, refused to allow the freshman squad to use the venue for either games or practices as they weren't expected to attract enough spectators to offset the cost. As a result, the freshman team was abandoned for the year. Despite the decision, Princeton's varsity squad was rounding into form towards the end of December and looked to be a challenger for the collegiate title.

The team began well, winning their first three games and taking two of three from Yale during their trip to Pittsburgh. Unfortunately, second-leading scorer Willian Humphreys was injured during the series. While Princeton managed to defeat Dartmouth in their next game the team was criticized for over-passing. Their second game of the Intercollegiate league turned out worse as Harvard used the large size of the Boston Arena to their advantage and shut out the Tigers 3–0.

The Tigers recovered with a win against an improving Yale squad but lost any chance they had at the title when Harvard won the second game. The contest was odd in that two 5-minute overtime periods were played with Harvard scoring in both extra sessions. The next game against Cornell was cancelled, leaving the team with a long layoff before their final match against Yale. While their season had not shaped up like they were hoping, there was good news for the program; the ice hockey team was making money. The Princeton athletic department reported that only three of its programs were not costing the university: football, baseball and ice hockey. The ice hockey team turned in profit of $186 for the 1914–15 season compared to a drain of $683 the year before. While the profits were small, the fact that Princeton could still draw during a disappointing season meant that the school would be likely to continue supporting the team unlike fellow schools Brown and Columbia.

Princeton was hoping to end their season with a victory over the Elis but Yale had other ideas. With Ford ineligible to play, the Bulldogs took the rematch and then claimed the series with a second win three night later, handing the Tigers another disappointing finish.

== Roster ==
No.	Nat.	Player	Class	Pos	Height	Weight	DoB	Hometown	Previous team
		William Clarkson	Junior	RW/D
		Henry Cohu	Junior	G
		Harold Comey	Junior	LW
		Holbrook Cushman	Sophomore	W
		Henry W. Ford	Junior	G					St. Paul's School
		Paul W. Hills	Junior	LW					St. Paul's School
		John Humphreys	Junior	D					St. Paul's School
		William Humphreys	Junior	W
		George Lawyer	Sophomore	LW
		Grant Peacock (C)	Senior	R/C
		Francis Rue	Sophomore	W
		William Schoen	Junior	R/C					St. Paul's School
		John Scully	Junior	D					Lawrenceville School

== Standings ==
1915–16 Collegiate ice hockey standings
	Intercollegiate							Overall					
	GP	W	L	T	PCT.	GF	GA	GP	W	L	T	GF	GA
Army	3	1	1	1	.500	4	10	4	2	1	1	13	11
Colgate	1	1	0	0	1.000	6	1	1	1	0	0	6	1
Cornell	2	1	1	0	.500	2	3	2	1	2	0	2	3
Dartmouth	7	4	3	0	.571	25	13	11	6	5	0	37	27
Harvard	6	6	0	0	1.000	20	2	10	8	2	0	31	12
Massachusetts Agricultural	7	3	4	0	.429	13	16	7	3	4	0	13	16
MIT	6	1	5	0	.167	6	22	8	1	6	1	8	29
New York State	–	–	–	–	–	–	–	–	–	–	–	–	–
Princeton	9	4	5	0	.444	17	21	10	5	5	0	23	24
Rensselaer	4	1	2	1	.375	9	13	4	1	2	1	9	13
Stevens Tech	–	–	–	–	–	–	–	–	–	–	–	–	–
Trinity	–	–	–	–	–	–	–	–	–	–	–	–	–
Williams	6	4	2	0	.667	22	14	6	4	2	0	22	14
Yale	12	7	5	0	.583	36	26	15	9	6	0	47	36
YMCA College	–	–	–	–	–	–	–	–	–	–	–	–	–

1915–16 Intercollegiate Hockey League standings
	Conference								Overall					
	GP	W	L	T	PTS	SW	GF	GA	GP	W	L	T	GF	GA
Harvard *	4	4	0	0	1.000	2	11	2	10	8	2	0	31	12
Yale	5	2	3	0	.400	1	12	12	15	9	6	0	47	36
Princeton	5	1	4	0	.200	0	6	15	10	5	5	0	23	24
* indicates conference champion

== Schedule and results ==
Date	Opponent	Site	Result	Record
Regular Season
December 22	at St. Paul's School*	Concord, New Hampshire	W 6–3	1–0–0
December 28	vs. Yale*	Winter Garden Rink • Pittsburgh, Pennsylvania	W 5–2	2–0–0
December 29	vs. Yale*	Winter Garden Rink • Pittsburgh, Pennsylvania	W 2–0	3–0–0
December 30	vs. Yale*	Winter Garden Rink • Pittsburgh, Pennsylvania	L 1–3	3–1–0
January 10	at St. Nicholas Hockey Club*	St. Nicholas Rink • New York, New York (Exhibition)	W 4–2	
January 12	vs. Dartmouth*	St. Nicholas Rink • New York, New York	W 3–1	4–1–0
January 15	vs. Harvard	Boston Arena • Boston, Massachusetts	L 0–3	4–2–0 (0–1–0)
January 19	vs. Yale	St. Nicholas Rink • New York, New York	W 2–1	5–2–0 (1–1–0)
January 22	at Harvard	St. Nicholas Rink • New York, New York	L 0–2 ^{2OT}	5–3–0 (1–2–0)
February 19	at Yale	New Haven Arena • New Haven, Connecticut	L 1–3	5–4–0 (1–3–0)
February 23	at Yale	New Haven Arena • New Haven, Connecticut	L 3–6	5–5–0 (1–4–0)
*Non-conference game.

== Scoring Statistics ==
Name	Position	Games	Goals
Grant Peacock	C/R	10	9
William Humphreys	W	4	4
Paul Hills	LW	7	3
Holbrook Cushman	W	10	3
George Lawyer	LW	2	1
Francis Rue	W	3	1
William Schoen	C/R	10	1
John Scully	D	10	1
William Clarkson	RW/D	2	0
Henry Cohu	G	2	0
Harold Comey	LW	3	0
Henry Ford	G	8	0
John Humphreys	D	9	0
Total			23

Note: Assists were not recorded as a statistic.

== Goaltending statistics ==
Name	Games	Minutes	Wins	Losses	Ties	Goals Against	Saves	Shut Outs	SV %	GAA*
Henry Ford	8	330	5	3	0	15		1		1.82
Henry Cohu	2	80	0	2	0	9		0		4.50
Total	10	410	5	5	0	24		1		2.34

* 40-minute regulation game time.
