= 1915–16 Cornell Big Red men's ice hockey season =

Intercollegiate hockey season

- Home ice: Beebe Lake

Record
- Overall: 1–1–0
- Road: 1–1–0

Coaches and captains
- Head coach: Talbot Hunter
- Captain: James Babbitt

The 1915–16 Cornell Big Red men's ice hockey season was the 15th season of play for the program.

== Season ==
The warm weather that had been affecting upstate New York for the past few years caused the athletic department at Cornell to finally surrender. With the team only able to schedule two away games for the entire season, the ice hockey program was shuttered until the team could have local ice to practice on. The onset of World War I caused a delay in the return of the team until 1920.

== Roster ==
No.	Nat.	Player	Class	Pos	Height	Weight	DoB	Hometown	Previous team
	(United States)	James S. Babbitt (C)	Senior	F			1893-10-13	New York, New York
	(United States)	John P. Harding Jr.	Senior	F				Saranac Lake, New York
	(United States)	Watson G. Harding	Sophomore	F			1895-09-10	Saranac Lake, New York
	(United States)	Converse Hill	Sophomore	D				Lexington, Massachusetts
	(United States)	Francis T. Hunter	Senior	D			1893-06-24	New Rochelle, New York
	(United States)	Robert A. Murphy	Junior				1890-06-12	Philadelphia, Pennsylvania
	(United States)	Ralph J. Myers	Senior	G				Pittsburgh, Pennsylvania
	(United States)	Frederick Spiegelberg Jr.	Senior	F			1895-11-17	New York, New York

== Standings ==
1915–16 Collegiate ice hockey standings
	Intercollegiate							Overall					
	GP	W	L	T	PCT.	GF	GA	GP	W	L	T	GF	GA
Army	3	1	1	1	.500	4	10	4	2	1	1	13	11
Colgate	1	1	0	0	1.000	6	1	1	1	0	0	6	1
Cornell	2	1	1	0	.500	2	3	2	1	2	0	2	3
Dartmouth	7	4	3	0	.571	25	13	11	6	5	0	37	27
Harvard	6	6	0	0	1.000	20	2	10	8	2	0	31	12
Massachusetts Agricultural	7	3	4	0	.429	13	16	7	3	4	0	13	16
MIT	6	1	5	0	.167	6	22	8	1	6	1	8	29
New York State	–	–	–	–	–	–	–	–	–	–	–	–	–
Princeton	9	4	5	0	.444	17	21	10	5	5	0	23	24
Rensselaer	4	1	2	1	.375	9	13	4	1	2	1	9	13
Stevens Tech	–	–	–	–	–	–	–	–	–	–	–	–	–
Trinity	–	–	–	–	–	–	–	–	–	–	–	–	–
Williams	6	4	2	0	.667	22	14	6	4	2	0	22	14
Yale	12	7	5	0	.583	36	26	15	9	6	0	47	36
YMCA College	–	–	–	–	–	–	–	–	–	–	–	–	–

== Schedule and results ==
Date	Opponent	Site	Result	Record
Regular season
January 11	at Harvard*	Boston Arena • Boston, Massachusetts	L 0–2	0–1–0
January 12	at MIT*	Boston Arena • Boston, Massachusetts	W 2–1	1–1–0
*Non-conference game.
