= 1915–16 Massachusetts Agricultural Aggies men's ice hockey season =

- Home ice: Alumni Field Rink

Record
- Overall: 3–4–0
- Home: 3–0–0
- Road: 0–3–0
- Neutral: 0–1–0

Coaches and captains
- Captain: Ray Chisholm

The 1915–16 Massachusetts Agricultural Aggies men's ice hockey season was the 8th season of play for the program.

== Roster ==
No.	Nat.	Player	Class	Pos	Height	Weight	DoB	Hometown	Previous team
		David H. Buttrick	Junior	G
		Ray L. Chisholm (C)	Senior
		Charles H. Fernald II	Senior
		Philip A. Plaisted	Senior
	(United States)	Louis W. Ross	Junior				1893-07-18	Arlington, Massachusetts
	(United States)	Carrick E. Wildon	Senior				1893-12-09	Everett, Massachusetts
		Harold C. Woolley	Senior

== Standings ==
1915–16 Collegiate ice hockey standings
	Intercollegiate							Overall					
	GP	W	L	T	PCT.	GF	GA	GP	W	L	T	GF	GA
Army	3	1	1	1	.500	4	10	4	2	1	1	13	11
Colgate	1	1	0	0	1.000	6	1	1	1	0	0	6	1
Cornell	2	1	1	0	.500	2	3	2	1	2	0	2	3
Dartmouth	7	4	3	0	.571	25	13	11	6	5	0	37	27
Harvard	6	6	0	0	1.000	20	2	10	8	2	0	31	12
Massachusetts Agricultural	7	3	4	0	.429	13	16	7	3	4	0	13	16
MIT	6	1	5	0	.167	6	22	8	1	6	1	8	29
New York State	–	–	–	–	–	–	–	–	–	–	–	–	–
Princeton	9	4	5	0	.444	17	21	10	5	5	0	23	24
Rensselaer	4	1	2	1	.375	9	13	4	1	2	1	9	13
Stevens Tech	–	–	–	–	–	–	–	–	–	–	–	–	–
Trinity	–	–	–	–	–	–	–	–	–	–	–	–	–
Williams	6	4	2	0	.667	22	14	6	4	2	0	22	14
Yale	12	7	5	0	.583	36	26	15	9	6	0	47	36
YMCA College	–	–	–	–	–	–	–	–	–	–	–	–	–

== Schedule and results ==
Date	Opponent	Site	Result	Record
Regular Season
December 29	at Dartmouth*	Boston Arena • Boston, Massachusetts	L 0–4	1–0–0
December 31	at MIT*	Boston Arena • Boston, Massachusetts	L 0–1	0–2–0
January 12	at Yale*	New Haven Arena • New Haven, Connecticut	L 1–5	0–3–0
January 19	YMCA College*	Alumni Field Rink • Amherst, Massachusetts	W 3–1	1–3–0
February 11	YMCA College*	Alumni Field Rink • Amherst, Massachusetts	W 5–2	2–3–0
February 17	Williams*	Alumni Field Rink • Amherst, Massachusetts	W 3–1	3–3–0
February 23	at Williams*	Weston Field Rink • Williamstown, Massachusetts	L 1–2	3–4–0
*Non-conference game.
