= Michael Joseph Hayes =

American football player and soldier

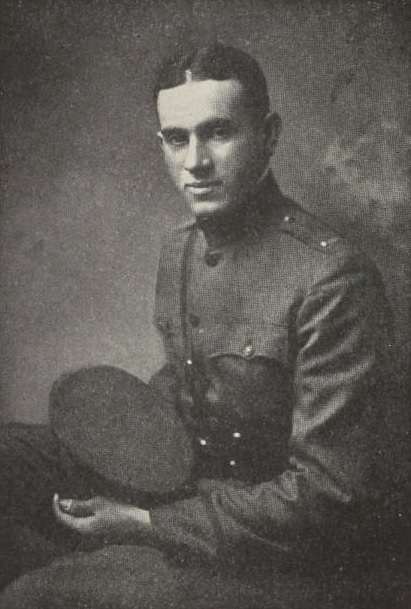
- Michael Joseph Hayes
- Born: 1894; Youngstown, Ohio, United States of America
- Died: 14 October 1918 (aged 23–24); Saint-Juvin, France
- Burial place: Arlington National Cemetery
- Military career
- Allegiance: United States of America
- Branch: United States Army
- Service years: 1917–1918
- Rank: First Lieutenant
- Units: 77th Division, 306th Infantry, F Company
- Conflicts: World War I
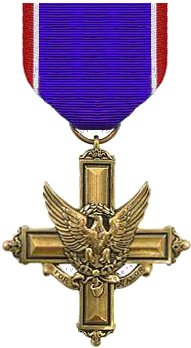
- Awards: Distinguished Service Cross

Michael Joseph Hayes (1894 – 14 October 1918) was born in Youngstown, Ohio and was a student athlete at Colgate University and a First Lieutenant in the United States Army. He was killed in an attack on Saint-Juvin, France on 14 October 1918 and was posthumously awarded the Distinguished Service Cross.

== Colgate ==
While at Colgate University, Hayes was a member of the football, hockey, and track teams. He lettered in football and track in 1916, and lettered in hockey from 1915–1917 while serving as two-time team captain. Hayes was also a member of the Delta Upsilon fraternity and the Skull and Scroll secret society. There is a plaque commemorating his service in the stairwell of Huntington Gymnasium. Prior to attending Colgate, Hayes was a student at Cleveland Central High School.

== Army ==
Hayes joined the Army in 1917 and won his commission at first officer training school in Plattsburgh, New York. He trained at Camp Upton where was also a member of the football team and coach of the hockey team. In the 1918 Millrose Games at Madison Square Garden Hayes took 1st place in the half-mile in full equipment.

== Service in France ==
Hayes was deployed to France with the 77th Division, 306th Infantry, F Company. On 14 August 1918 he volunteered for a rescue operation into no man's land to save his company commander, Robert P. Patterson. For his actions he received a citation from the Army: "On Aug 14, 1918, with great courage and coolness, he led a patrol of three men and himself to the rescue of his company commander, who was lying approximately twenty yards in front of a German machine gun post of greatly superior numbers, and with great courage and dash attacked this machine gun post, inflicting several casualties with hand grenades and rifle fire, and drew heavy fire from machine guns and somehow managed to return with his patrol to safety."

== Death and posthumous award ==
Hayes was killed on 14 October 1918 while mounting an attack of the town of Saint-Juvin, France. Patterson later said that Hayes was "the highest type of soldier, gentleman, and American" and that Hayes' death marked the one time during the war when "no one in F Company made a secret of his sorrow". Hayes was posthumously awarded the Distinguished Service Cross. An excerpt from his award reads: "In the face of direct fire from enemy machine-guns upon his platoon, disregarding his own personal safety, he went forward to reconnoiter and find cover for his men from which to continue the attack. In the performance of his courageous enterprise he was killed by machine-gun fire."

Hayes is buried in Section 3, Grave 4250-NH of Arlington National Cemetery.
