= Saint-Juvin =

- Commune
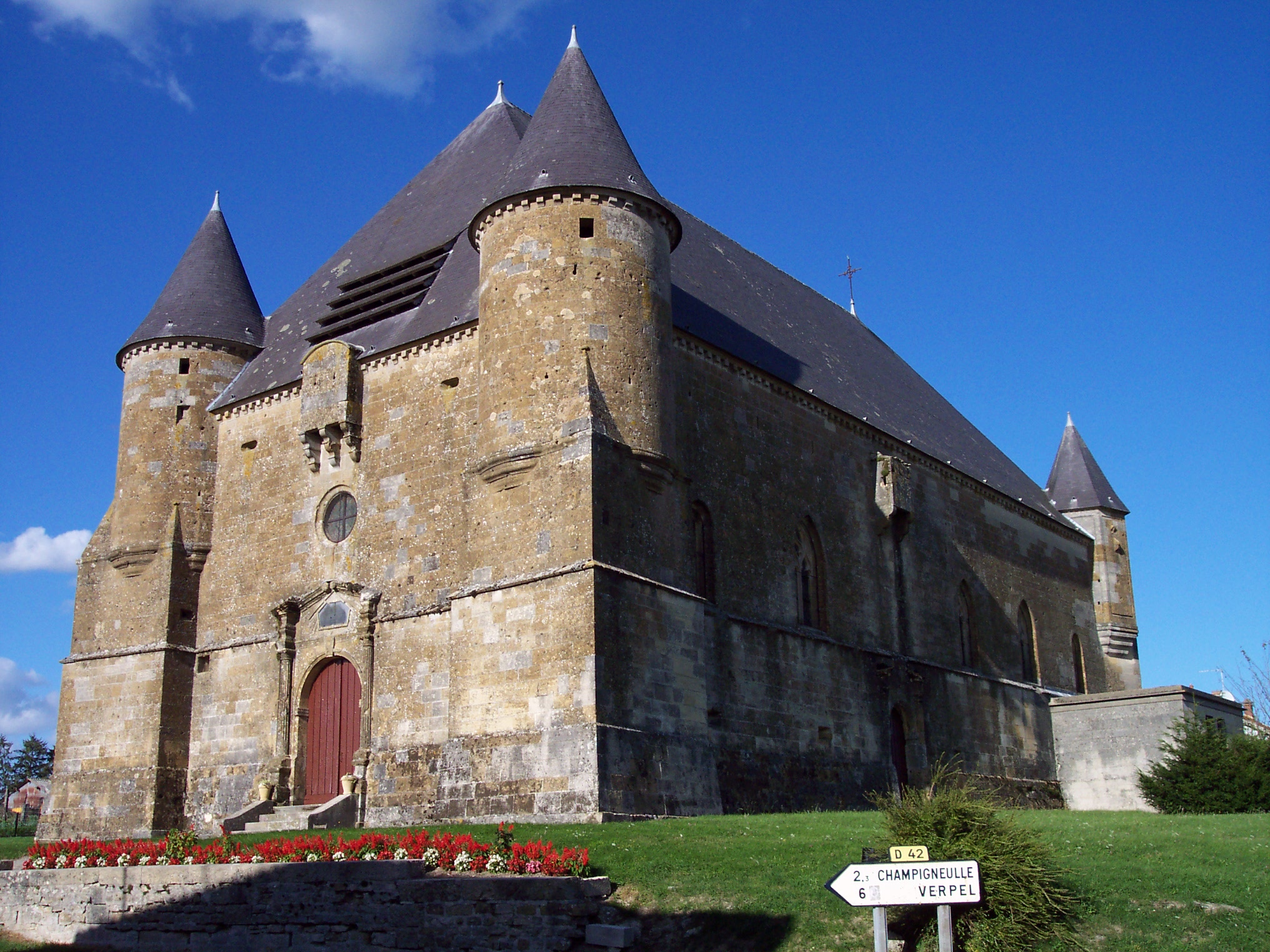
- The fortress church in Saint-Juvin
- Location of Saint-Juvin
- Location within France Location within Grand Est
- Coordinates: 49°20′09″N 4°56′24″E
- Country: France
- Region: Grand Est
- Department: Ardennes
- Arrondissement: Vouziers
- Canton: Attigny
- Intercommunality: Argonne Ardennaise

Government
  - Mayor (2020–2026): Francis Cannaux
- Area^{1}: 9.4 km^{2} (3.6 sq mi)
- Elevation: 151 m (495 ft)
- Population (2023): 100
  - Density: 11/km^{2} (28/sq mi)
- Time zone: UTC+01:00 (CET)
  - Summer (DST): UTC+02:00 (CEST)
- INSEE/Postal code: 08383 /08250
- ^{1} French Land Register data, which excludes lakes, ponds, glaciers > 1 km^{2} (0.386 sq mi or 247 acres) and river estuaries.

Saint-Juvin (French pronunciation: [sɛ̃ ʒyvɛ̃]) is a commune in the Ardennes department in northern France.

== Population ==
Historical population
Year	Pop.	±% p.a.
1968	176	—
1975	172	−0.33%
1982	142	−2.70%
1990	121	−1.98%
1999	129	+0.71%
2007	111	−1.86%
2012	112	+0.18%
2017	104	−1.47%
2023	100	−0.65%
Source: INSEE

== See also ==
- Communes of the Ardennes department
