= 1938–39 Duquesne Dukes men's ice hockey season =

Penn-Ohio League, Champion
- Conference: Penn-Ohio League
- Home ice: Duquesne Garden

Record
- Overall: 18–3–1
- Conference: 17–1–0
- Home: 5–0–0
- Road: 6–0–0
- Neutral: 7–3–1

Coaches and captains
- Head coach: Louis A. Dietrich
- Captain(s): Walter McGill; Bill Vance

The 1938–39 Duquesne Dukes men's ice hockey season was the 2nd season of play for the program.

== Season ==
Hot on the heels of a successful first season, Duquesne's second campaign began with good news as several non-conference programs expressed interest in coming to Pittsburgh and playing the Dukes. At the beginning of the season the two divisions codified a single set of rules where the three regulation periods would run for 12 minutes. Last season, games at Duquesne Garden had 15-minute sessions while the ones at the Cleveland Arena went for 10 minutes. The practical reason for this was because all league teams shared two homes rinks. Since multiple games needed to be played on the same day, Penn-Ohio League games had to be shorter than those played by the rest of the college hockey world.

Duquesne began well, winning their first two-game before meeting Pittsburgh in early December. The Panthers were fast becoming Duquesne's biggest rival and the Blue and Gold handed the Dukes their first loss of the season. Duquesne rebounded in the next game with a stellar effort against Carnegie Tech, outshooting the Skibos 30–5 in 36 minutes, but were only able to get one goal past the Tartan netminder. An even bigger win followed when the Dukes handed John Carroll only its second loss since the start of last season. To this point Duquesne was the only team that was able halt the juggernaut Blue Streak team. After the Dukes shutout JCU for a second time, they set up a showdown with Pitt that could very well decide the league championship. Duquesne won the rematch 2–0 to place them above the Panthers in the standings and then followed that up with several weeks off.

After examinations, the team resumed their schedule with a new addition to the team. Dick Scully, a small but talented player, had passed his exams and was now eligible to play on the varsity team. He spent a few games getting used to his new teammates and then starred by scoring all three goals in the team's victory over Pitt on February 14. The win all but handed the east division to the Dukes and the team followed that up by taking the next three games all by a wide margin. The Dukes ended their regular season against Pitt and the two teams fought a bitter battle for about 20 minutes. In the later half of the second period, Bill Vance tied the game at 2–2 on a goal that Pittsburgh vehemently protested against. When the goal was allowed to stand, Pitt coach Jack McSorley took his team off the ice and abandoned the game. As a result, the Panthers were charged with a forfeit and Duquesne was handed their 15th win of the season. The Dukes finished out as the regular season league champion after two more wins and entered the playoffs with a change to avenge last seasons' defeat.

The playoff format had been changed from a total-goal series to one where two wins were required. Duquesne won their first game against Pitt 3–2 and then followed that up with a 1–1 tie. The tie stood due to the rink schedule and didn't help either squad get closer to a victory. By the third game, Pitt began to take over and tied the series, sending the two to a fourth match where Duquesne was knocked out of the tournament. The Dukes would never get the chance to repay Pitt for the loss before the Panthers ended their program before the start of the following season.

== Roster ==
No.	Nat.	Player	Class	Pos	Height	Weight	DoB	Hometown	Previous team
2		John Liebgot		F
3		Bill Vance (C)		F
5		Harry Foster		F
6		Rod Schaeffer		F
14		Walter McGill (C)		F
		Fran Fogarty
		Jim Hansberry		F
		Alex Iungerich	Senior	G
		Steve Olah	Sophomore	D
	(United States)	Dick Scully	Sophomore	F				Pittsburgh, Pennsylvania
		Frank Sweeney	Sophomore	D
		Jim Unger	Sophomore	D

== Standings ==
1938–39 Penn-Ohio Intercollegiate Hockey League standings
	Conference							Overall					
	GP	W	L	T	PTS	GF	GA	GP	W	L	T	GF	GA
East
Duquesne †	18	17	1	0	34	68	12	22	18	3	1	74	20
Pittsburgh ~	18	12	4	2	26	43	18	25	14	8	3	55	41
Carnegie Tech	–	–	–	–	–	–	–	–	–	–	–	–	–
West
John Carroll †~*	–	–	–	–	–	–	–	–	–	–	–	–	–
Western Reserve	–	–	–	–	–	–	–	–	–	–	–	–	–
Baldwin Wallace	–	–	–	–	–	–	–	–	–	–	–	–	–
Case	–	–	–	–	–	–	–	–	–	–	–	–	–
Fenn	–	–	–	–	–	–	–	–	–	–	–	–	–
† indicates division regular season champion ~ indicates division tournament champion * indicates conference tournament champion

== Schedule and results ==
Date	Opponent	Site	Result	Record
Regular Season
November 30	Western Reserve	Duquesne Garden • Pittsburgh, Pennsylvania	W 2–0	1–0–0 (1–0–0)
December 2	at Fenn	Cleveland Arena • Cleveland, Ohio	W 4–1	2–0–0 (2–0–0)
December 3	vs. Pittsburgh	Duquesne Garden • Pittsburgh, Pennsylvania	L 1–2	2–1–0 (2–1–0)
December 13	vs. Carnegie Tech	Duquesne Garden • Pittsburgh, Pennsylvania	W 1–0	3–1–0 (3–1–0)
December 21	at John Carroll	Cleveland Arena • Cleveland, Ohio	W 2–0	4–1–0 (4–1–0)
January 11	John Carroll	Duquesne Garden • Pittsburgh, Pennsylvania	W 3–0	5–1–0 (5–1–0)
January 19	vs. Pittsburgh	Duquesne Garden • Pittsburgh, Pennsylvania	W 3–0	6–1–0 (6–1–0)
February 1	vs. Carnegie Tech	Duquesne Garden • Pittsburgh, Pennsylvania	W 6–1	7–1–0 (7–1–0)
February ?	at Case	Cleveland Arena • Cleveland, Ohio	W 2–1	8–1–0 (8–1–0)
February 7	Baldwin Wallace	Duquesne Garden • Pittsburgh, Pennsylvania	W 11–0	9–1–0 (9–1–0)
February ?	at Western Reserve	Cleveland Arena • Cleveland, Ohio	W 3–2	10–1–0 (10–1–0)
February 14	vs. Pittsburgh	Duquesne Garden • Pittsburgh, Pennsylvania	W 3–2	11–1–0 (11–1–0)
February 18	vs. Carnegie Tech	Duquesne Garden • Pittsburgh, Pennsylvania	W 4–1	12–1–0 (12–1–0)
February 24	at Baldwin Wallace	Cleveland Arena • Cleveland, Ohio	W 11–0	13–1–0 (13–1–0)
March 1	Fenn	Duquesne Garden • Pittsburgh, Pennsylvania	W 6–0	14–1–0 (14–1–0)
March 7	vs. Pittsburgh	Duquesne Garden • Pittsburgh, Pennsylvania	W 3–2 (forfeit)	15–1–0 (15–1–0)
March 14	vs. Carnegie Tech	Duquesne Garden • Pittsburgh, Pennsylvania	W 2–0	16–1–0 (16–1–0)
March ?	Case	Duquesne Garden • Pittsburgh, Pennsylvania	W 1–0	17–1–0 (17–1–0)
Penn-Ohio League Playoffs
March 22	vs. Pittsburgh*	Duquesne Garden • Pittsburgh, Pennsylvania (Eastern Division Game 1)	W 3–2	18–1–0
March ?	vs. Pittsburgh*	Duquesne Garden • Pittsburgh, Pennsylvania (Eastern Division Game 2)	T 1–1 ^{5OT}	18–1–1
March ?	vs. Pittsburgh*	Duquesne Garden • Pittsburgh, Pennsylvania (Eastern Division Game 3)	L 1–3	18–2–1
April ?	vs. Pittsburgh*	Duquesne Garden • Pittsburgh, Pennsylvania (Eastern Division Game 4)	L 1–2	18–3–1
Duquesne Lost Series 1–2–1
*Non-conference game.
