= 1937–38 Carnegie Tech Tartans men's ice hockey season =

- Conference: Penn-Ohio League
- Home ice: Duquesne Garden

Record
- Overall: 3–8–1
- Conference: 3–8–1

Coaches and captains
- Head coach: Herbert Fair
- Captain: Art Burleigh

The 1937–38 Carnegie Tech Tartans men's ice hockey season was the 7th season of play for the program.

== Season ==
When the Penn-Ohio Intercollegiate Hockey League was being formed, Carnegie Tech was more than happy to join the new league. The biggest trouble with the team previously had been finding local opponents and this league would help solve that problem. Once the Duquesne Garden was secured as a venue, they were joined by two other Pittsburgh-area teams and formed the league with four Cleveland counterparts. In the first season they played all 6 conference opponents twice and came out on the wrong side of the ledger more often than not. While most of their games were close, the Tartans won only three games and finished last in the east division.

== Roster ==
| No. | Nat. | Player | Class | Pos | Height | Weight | DoB | Hometown | Previous team |
|---|---|---|---|---|---|---|---|---|---|
| | | Ament |
| | | Art Burleigh (C) | Sophomore | F |
| | | Culver |
| | | Gibson |
| | | Griggs |
| | | Havlish |
| | (United States) | Vern W. Schilawske | Sophomore | | | | | Detroit, Michigan |
| | | Stapor |
| | (United States) | Walter C. Wilson | Sophomore | | | | | Andover, Massachusetts |
| | | Wood |

== Standings ==
1937–38 Penn-Ohio Intercollegiate Hockey League standings
| | Conference | | | | | | | Overall | | | | | |
| | GP | W | L | T | PTS | GF | GA | GP | W | L | T | GF | GA |
East
| Duquesne † | 12 | 10 | 2 | 0 | 20 | 41 | 14 | 14 | 11 | 3 | 0 | 42 | 17 |
| Pittsburgh ~ | 12 | 9 | 2 | 1 | 19 | – | – | 17 | 10 | 6 | 1 | – | – |
| Carnegie Tech | 12 | 3 | 8 | 1 | 7 | 16 | 29 | 12 | 3 | 8 | 1 | 16 | 29 |
West
| John Carroll †~* | 12 | 10 | 1 | 1 | 21 | 54 | 12 | 16 | 13 | 1 | 2 | 64 | 16 |
| Western Reserve | – | – | – | – | – | – | – | – | – | – | – | – | – |
| Fenn | 12 | 2 | 9 | 1 | 5 | – | – | – | – | – | – | – | – |
| Baldwin Wallace | – | – | – | – | – | – | – | – | – | – | – | – | – |
† indicates division regular season champion ~ indicates division tournament champion * indicates conference tournament champion

== Schedule and results ==
| Date | Opponent | Site | Result | Record |
Regular Season
| December 14 | vs. Western Reserve | Duquesne Garden • Pittsburgh, Pennsylvania | L 0–4 | 0–1–0 (0–1–0) |
| January 19 | vs. Duquesne | Duquesne Garden • Pittsburgh, Pennsylvania | L 3–4 | 0–2–0 (0–2–0) |
| January 26 | vs. Pittsburgh | Duquesne Garden • Pittsburgh, Pennsylvania | L 0–4 | 0–3–0 (0–3–0) |
| ? | Fenn | ? | W 3–0 | 1–3–0 (1–3–0) |
| ? | Baldwin Wallace | ? | W 3–0 | 2–3–0 (2–3–0) |
| ? | Fenn | ? | L 1–2 | 2–4–0 (2–4–0) |
| March 2 | vs. Duquesne | Duquesne Garden • Pittsburgh, Pennsylvania | L 2–4 | 2–5–0 (2–5–0) |
| ? | vs. John Carroll | ? | L 0–6 | 2–6–0 (2–6–0) |
| ? | vs. John Carroll | ? | L 1–3 | 2–7–0 (2–7–0) |
| ? | vs. Pittsburgh | Duquesne Garden • Pittsburgh, Pennsylvania | L 1–2 | 2–8–0 (2–8–0) |
| ? | Baldwin Wallace | ? | W 2–0 | 3–8–0 (3–8–0) |
| ? | Western Reserve | ? | T 0–0 | 3–8–1 (3–8–1) |
*Non-conference game.
