= 1937–38 John Carroll Blue Streaks men's ice hockey season =

Penn-Ohio League, Champion Penn-Ohio League Tournament, Champion
- Conference: 1st Penn-Ohio League
- Home ice: Cleveland Arena

Record
- Overall: 13–1–2

Coaches and captains
- Head coach: Fred Robertson
- Assistant coaches: Herb Bee
- Captain: Danny Ryan

The 1937–38 John Carroll Blue Streaks men's ice hockey season was the inaugural season of play for the program.

== Season ==
John Carroll was one of four Cleveland-area teams to either found or restart a varsity ice hockey program in 1937. Those schools joined with three Pittsburgh-area teams in similar circumstances and formed the Penn-Ohio Intercollegiate Hockey League. In their first season, John Carroll rose to the top of the conference in the wake of their best player, Maine-native Eddie Arsenault. Already a fixture on the football team, Arsenault led the Blue Streaks to a 1st-place finish in their division and then marched to a conference championship against Pittsburgh. The win was the first major championship for John Carroll and the team received the Sutphin-Harris trophy for their accomplishment. The team was coached by Fred Robertson of the Cleveland Barons, the operators of the Cleveland Arena.

== Roster ==
No.	Nat.	Player	Class	Pos	Height	Weight	DoB	Hometown	Previous team
		Edward J. Arsenault	Sophomore	F
		S. James Foti	Senior
		Joseph F. Hoctor	Sophomore	F
		Theodore J. Lempges	Sophomore	D
		Cyril M. LeVoie	Sophomore
		John J. Manofsky	Sophomore	F
		John P. Murray	Sophomore	F
		Joe Quayle	Sophomore	D
		Wilfred Rancourt	Sophomore	F
		Daniel Ryan	Junior	G/D
		Alvin J. Sutton	Sophomore	F
		James F. Wilson	Junior	D
		George Zemba	Sophomore	D

== Standings ==
1937–38 Penn-Ohio Intercollegiate Hockey League standings
	Conference							Overall					
	GP	W	L	T	PTS	GF	GA	GP	W	L	T	GF	GA
East
Duquesne †	12	10	2	0	20	41	14	14	11	3	0	42	17
Pittsburgh ~	12	9	2	1	19	–	–	17	10	6	1	–	–
Carnegie Tech	12	3	8	1	7	16	29	12	3	8	1	16	29
West
John Carroll †~*	12	10	1	1	21	54	12	16	13	1	2	64	16
Western Reserve	–	–	–	–	–	–	–	–	–	–	–	–	–
Fenn	12	2	9	1	5	–	–	–	–	–	–	–	–
Baldwin Wallace	–	–	–	–	–	–	–	–	–	–	–	–	–
† indicates division regular season champion ~ indicates division tournament champion * indicates conference tournament champion

== Schedule and results ==
Date	Opponent	Site	Result	Record
Regular season
?	vs. Fenn	Cleveland Arena • Cleveland, Ohio	W 9–1	1–0–0 (1–0–0)
?	vs. Baldwin Wallace	Cleveland Arena • Cleveland, Ohio	W 7–2	2–0–0 (2–0–0)
?	vs. Western Reserve	Cleveland Arena • Cleveland, Ohio	W 5–2	3–0–0 (3–0–0)
January 9	vs. Baldwin Wallace	Cleveland Arena • Cleveland, Ohio	W 8–2	4–0–0 (4–0–0)
January 19	at Pittsburgh	Duquesne Garden • Pittsburgh, Pennsylvania	W 3–0	5–0–0 (5–0–0)
?	at Duquesne	Duquesne Garden • Pittsburgh, Pennsylvania	W 1–0	6–0–0 (6–0–0)
?	vs. Fenn	Cleveland Arena • Cleveland, Ohio	W 6–0	7–0–0 (7–0–0)
March 5	Duquesne	Cleveland Arena • Cleveland, Ohio	L 1–2	7–1–0 (7–1–0)
?	Carnegie Tech	?	W 6–0	8–1–0 (8–1–0)
?	vs. Western Reserve	Cleveland Arena • Cleveland, Ohio	W 4–1	9–1–0 (9–1–0)
?	Carnegie Tech	?	W 3–1	10–1–0 (10–1–0)
?	Pittsburgh	Cleveland Arena • Cleveland, Ohio	T 1–1	10–1–1 (10–1–1)
Penn-Ohio League Playoffs
?	vs. Western Reserve	Cleveland Arena • Cleveland, Ohio (Western Division Game 1)	T 2–2	10–1–2
?	vs. Western Reserve	Cleveland Arena • Cleveland, Ohio (Western Division Game 2)	W 2–1 ^{OT}	11–1–2
John Carroll Won Series 4–3
?	at Pittsburgh	Duquesne Garden • Pittsburgh, Pennsylvania (Championship Game 1)	W 4–1	12–1–2
?	vs. Pittsburgh	Cleveland Arena • Cleveland, Ohio (Championship Game 2)	W 2–0	13–1–2
John Carroll Won Series 6–1
*Non-conference game.
