= 1937–38 Duquesne Dukes men's ice hockey season =

- Conference: Penn-Ohio League
- Home ice: Duquesne Garden

Record
- Overall: 11–3–0
- Conference: 10–2–0
- Home: 3–1–0
- Road: 4–0–0
- Neutral: 4–2–0

Coaches and captains
- Head coach: Louis A. Dietrich
- Captain: Walter McGill

The 1937–38 Duquesne Dukes men's ice hockey season was the inaugural season of play for the program.

== Season ==
With the backing of Al Sutphin, owner of the Cleveland Arena, and John Harris, owner of the Duquesne Garden, Duquesne was a founding member of the Penn-Ohio Intercollegiate Hockey League. With Father Louis A. Deitrich heading the new program, a roster was assembled mostly from the previous year's championship club team. The team's first scheduled game was cancelled when the University of Akron wasn't able to continue with the league. Instead, the team played its first game against Pittsburgh on December 14. The game was attended by about 1,000 fans and saw Duquesne win their first ever varsity hockey game.

Duquesne didn't play for several weeks afterwards due to the Christmas break, but they returned with a second victory, this time over Carnegie Tech in mid-January. The team got a wake-up call in early February when they lost consecutive games and dropped to 2nd in their division. Since Pitt was also a very strong team that season, the Dukes couldn't afford too many losses if they wanted a division crown. They responded with an inspired brand of hockey and won their final 7 games of the regular season. In that time, Duquesne provided the biggest upset of the Penn-Ohio League by defeating John Carroll who, until that point, had been undefeated.

In the program's first playoff game, Duquesne fought a close affair with Pittsburgh but were able to triumph 1–0 over the Panthers. Because the league had decided on a two-game total-goal series, the win didn't give the Dukes much of a cushion and they couldn't afford to lost the second game. Unfortunately, Pitt rallied and a hat-trick from Bob Schooley gave the Panthers a 3–0 win and ended Duquesne's season on a sour note.

== Roster ==
No.	Nat.	Player	Class	Pos	Height	Weight	DoB	Hometown	Previous team
1		Jerry Rodenbaugh		G
2		John Liebgot		F
3		Bill Vance		F
4		Jim Friday		D
5		Harry Foster		F
6		Rod Schaeffer		F
7		Clancy
8		Fredak
10		McCoy
11		Mannion
12		Frank Gill		D
14		Walter McGill (C)		F
15		J. Bonner		F
22		Boyd Brumbaugh		D
26		Amann
45		Joe Maras		D

== Standings ==
1937–38 Penn-Ohio Intercollegiate Hockey League standings
	Conference							Overall					
	GP	W	L	T	PTS	GF	GA	GP	W	L	T	GF	GA
East
Duquesne †	12	10	2	0	20	41	14	14	11	3	0	42	17
Pittsburgh ~	12	9	2	1	19	–	–	17	10	6	1	–	–
Carnegie Tech	12	3	8	1	7	16	29	12	3	8	1	16	29
West
John Carroll †~*	12	10	1	1	21	54	12	16	13	1	2	64	16
Western Reserve	–	–	–	–	–	–	–	–	–	–	–	–	–
Fenn	12	2	9	1	5	–	–	–	–	–	–	–	–
Baldwin Wallace	–	–	–	–	–	–	–	–	–	–	–	–	–
† indicates division regular season champion ~ indicates division tournament champion * indicates conference tournament champion

== Schedule and results ==
Date	Opponent	Site	Result	Record
Regular Season
December 14	vs. Pittsburgh	Duquesne Garden • Pittsburgh, Pennsylvania	W 3–1	1–0–0 (1–0–0)
January 19	vs. Carnegie Tech	Duquesne Garden • Pittsburgh, Pennsylvania	W 4–3	2–0–0 (2–0–0)
January ?	Fenn	Duquesne Garden • Pittsburgh, Pennsylvania	W 5–2	3–0–0 (3–0–0)
February ?	John Carroll	Duquesne Garden • Pittsburgh, Pennsylvania	L 0–1	3–1–0 (3–1–0)
February 9	vs. Pittsburgh	Duquesne Garden • Pittsburgh, Pennsylvania	L 0–1	3–2–0 (3–2–0)
February 17	at Western Reserve	Cleveland Arena • Cleveland, Ohio	W 2–1	4–2–0 (4–2–0)
February 25	at Baldwin Wallace	Cleveland Arena • Cleveland, Ohio	W 11–0	5–2–0 (5–2–0)
March 2	vs. Carnegie Tech	Duquesne Garden • Pittsburgh, Pennsylvania	W 4–2	6–2–0 (6–2–0)
March 5	at John Carroll	Cleveland Arena • Cleveland, Ohio	W 2–1	7–2–0 (7–2–0)
March 6	Baldwin Wallace	Duquesne Garden • Pittsburgh, Pennsylvania	W 4–0	8–2–0 (8–2–0)
March 11	Fenn	Cleveland Arena • Cleveland, Ohio	W 3–1	9–2–0 (9–2–0)
March 12	Western Reserve	Duquesne Garden • Pittsburgh, Pennsylvania	W 3–1	10–2–0 (10–2–0)
Penn-Ohio League Playoffs
March 21	vs. Pittsburgh*	Duquesne Garden • Pittsburgh, Pennsylvania (Eastern Division Game 1)	W 1–0	11–2–0
March 22	vs. Pittsburgh*	Duquesne Garden • Pittsburgh, Pennsylvania (Eastern Division Game 2)	L 0–3	11–3–0
Duquesne Lost Series 1–3
*Non-conference game.
