= 1906–07 Yale Bulldogs men's ice hockey season =

College ice hockey season

- Conference: IHA

Record
- Overall: 3–6–0
- Conference: 3–3–0
- Road: 3–1–0
- Neutral: 0–5–0

Coaches and captains
- Captain: Harold Stanley

The 1906–07 Yale Bulldogs men's ice hockey season was the 12th season of play for the program.

== Season ==
The team did not have a coach, however, C. Buchanan Stuart served as team manager.

== Roster ==
| No. | Nat. | Player | Class | Pos | Height | Weight | DoB | Hometown | Previous team |
|---|---|---|---|---|---|---|---|---|---|
| | (United States) | Lucius Biglow | Junior | D | | | 1885-02-28 | Brooklyn, New York |
| | | John Dilworth | Graduate | F |
| | | Frederic Dolbeare | Senior |
| | | Conrad Driscoll | Junior | R |
| | | Charles Howard | Sophomore |
| | (United States) | William Knox | Senior | F | | | 1885-01-29 | Connellsville, Pennsylvania |
| | | Fred Lang | Senior | G |
| | (United States) | Harold Stanley (C) | Junior | F | | | 1885-10-02 | Great Barrington, Massachusetts |
| | | Gordon Thayer | Junior |
| | | Charley Williams | Junior | D |

== Standings ==
1906–07 Collegiate ice hockey standings
| | Intercollegiate | | | | | | | Overall | | | | | |
| | GP | W | L | T | PCT. | GF | GA | GP | W | L | T | GF | GA |
|---|---|---|---|---|---|---|---|---|---|---|---|---|---|
| Army | 3 | 1 | 2 | 0 | .333 | 2 | 6 | 9 | 3 | 6 | 0 | 15 | 27 |
| Carnegie Tech | 2 | 1 | 1 | 0 | .500 | 1 | 2 | – | – | – | – | – | – |
| Columbia | 4 | 0 | 4 | 0 | .000 | 4 | 17 | 5 | 0 | 5 | 0 | 4 | 28 |
| Cornell | 2 | 2 | 0 | 0 | 1.000 | 11 | 0 | 2 | 2 | 0 | 0 | 11 | 0 |
| Dartmouth | 5 | 3 | 2 | 0 | .600 | 15 | 20 | 7 | 5 | 2 | 0 | 30 | 25 |
| Harvard | 6 | 5 | 1 | 0 | .833 | 49 | 11 | 10 | 8 | 2 | 0 | 66 | 21 |
| MIT | 4 | 1 | 3 | 0 | .250 | 4 | 17 | 7 | 3 | 4 | 0 | 19 | 26 |
| Princeton | 4 | 4 | 0 | 0 | 1.000 | 14 | 6 | 8 | 5 | 3 | 0 | 20 | 25 |
| Rensselaer | 3 | 2 | 1 | 0 | .667 | 4 | 2 | 3 | 2 | 1 | 0 | 4 | 2 |
| Rochester | – | – | – | – | – | – | – | – | – | – | – | – | – |
| Springfield Training | – | – | – | – | – | – | – | – | – | – | – | – | – |
| Trinity | – | – | – | – | – | – | – | – | – | – | – | – | – |
| Union | – | – | – | – | – | – | – | 1 | 1 | 0 | 0 | – | – |
| Western University of Pennsylvania | 2 | 0 | 2 | 0 | .000 | 0 | 3 | 2 | 0 | 2 | 0 | 0 | 3 |
| Williams | 2 | 0 | 2 | 0 | .000 | 3 | 5 | 5 | 1 | 4 | 0 | 12 | 17 |
| Yale | 6 | 3 | 3 | 0 | .500 | 13 | 12 | 9 | 3 | 6 | 0 | 15 | 20 |

1906–07 Intercollegiate Hockey Association standings
| | Conference | | | | | | | Overall | | | | | |
| | GP | W | L | T | PTS | GF | GA | GP | W | L | T | GF | GA |
|---|---|---|---|---|---|---|---|---|---|---|---|---|---|
| Princeton * | 4 | 4 | 0 | 0 | 8 | 14 | 6 | 8 | 5 | 3 | 0 | 20 | 25 |
| Harvard | 4 | 3 | 1 | 0 | 6 | 25 | 9 | 10 | 8 | 2 | 0 | 66 | 21 |
| Dartmouth | 4 | 2 | 2 | 0 | 4 | 12 | 18 | 7 | 5 | 2 | 0 | 30 | 25 |
| Yale | 4 | 1 | 3 | 0 | 2 | 9 | 12 | 9 | 3 | 6 | 0 | 15 | 20 |
| Columbia | 4 | 0 | 4 | 0 | 0 | 4 | 17 | 5 | 0 | 5 | 0 | 4 | 28 |
* indicates conference champion

== Schedule and results ==
| Date | Opponent | Site | Result | Record |
Regular season
| December 16 | at New York Hockey Club* | St. Nicholas Rink • New York, New York | L 2–5 | 0–1–0 |
| January 2 | at Carnegie Tech* | Duquesne Garden • Pittsburgh, Pennsylvania | W 2–0 | 1–1–0 |
| January 3 | at Western University of Pennsylvania* | Duquesne Garden • Pittsburgh, Pennsylvania | W 2–0 | 2–1–0 |
| January 4 | vs. Queen's* | Duquesne Garden • Pittsburgh, Pennsylvania | L 0–1 | 2–2–0 |
| January 5 | vs. Queen's* | Duquesne Garden • Pittsburgh, Pennsylvania | L 0–2 | 2–3–0 |
| January 16 | vs. Dartmouth | St. Nicholas Rink • New York, New York | L 2–4 | 2–4–0 (0–1–0) |
| January 27 | at Columbia | St. Nicholas Rink • New York, New York | W 4–3 | 3–4–0 (1–1–0) |
| February 10 | vs. Princeton | St. Nicholas Rink • New York, New York | L 1–2 | 3–5–0 (1–2–0) |
| February 17 | vs. Harvard | St. Nicholas Rink • New York, New York (Rivalry) | L 2–3 | 3–6–0 (1–3–0) |
*Non-conference game.
