= 1938–39 Pittsburgh Panthers men's ice hockey season =

- Conference: 3rd Penn-Ohio League
- Home ice: Duquesne Garden

Record
- Overall: 14–8–3
- Conference: 12–4–2
- Home: 4–2–1
- Road: 4–2–0
- Neutral: 6–4–2

Coaches and captains
- Head coach: John McSorley
- Captain: Bob Schooley

The 1938–39 Pittsburgh men's ice hockey season was the 9th season of play for the program.

== Season ==
Pitt's second season in the Penn-Ohio League went eerily similar to its first. The team played well in the regular season, finishing third in the conference and second in the Pittsburgh division. They were dominant against most of their conference opponents, going undefeated versus five of seven teams, however, the two top clubs presented a difficult challenge for the Panthers. Pitt managed to earn a tie in one game against defending league champion, John Carroll, but dropped the other. Duquesne proved to be a tougher nut to crack; the Panthers won once in four games against the Dukes, however, it was the only loss that Duquesne suffered in the regular season. The fourth of those matches ended in a forfeit for Pitt when coach John McSorley removed his team from the ice in protest over the referee allowing a controversial goal that tied the match.

After the regular season, Athletic Director James Hagan was willing to concede the playoff match to Duquesne, however, both the League and the Dukes insisted that Pitt compete as outlined in conference rules. The First match continued the series of close games between the two with Pitt dropping the game 2–3. A loss in the second game would have ended their season but Bud Ellis played a tremendous game in goal, allowing just a single goal. Duquesne's netminder was equal to the task and both teams played long into the night. After 5 overtime periods and 115 minutes of ice time, the game was called a draw when the Duquesne Garden refused to allow the match to continue. The extended game appeared to sap the power from Duquesne and they only managed one goal in each of the next two matches. Pitt, on the other hand, found its second wind and scored just enough to win both matches and upset the heavily favored Dukes. Unfortunately for Pitt, the long series left them precious little time to rest before the Championship series with John Carroll and the Blue Streaks took full advantage. John Carroll won a pair of 3–2 games to repeat as league champions and Pitt had to accept being runners-up once more.

== Roster ==
No.	Nat.	Player	Class	Pos	Height	Weight	DoB	Hometown	Previous team
		Irv Artz
		Taylor Brittain	Senior
		Lenny Broido	Senior
		Chuck Connick	Senior
		Pat Cusick
		Burgin Digby
		Edwin Ellis	Senior	G
		Dick Friday
		Walter Lovett
		Bob Lowe
		Bill Schildecker
		Bob Schooley (C)	Senior
		Clyde Shiring
		Vic Williams

== Standings ==
1938–39 Penn-Ohio Intercollegiate Hockey League standings
	Conference							Overall					
	GP	W	L	T	PTS	GF	GA	GP	W	L	T	GF	GA
East
Duquesne †	18	17	1	0	34	68	12	22	18	3	1	74	20
Pittsburgh ~	18	12	4	2	26	43	18	25	14	8	3	55	41
Carnegie Tech	–	–	–	–	–	–	–	–	–	–	–	–	–
West
John Carroll †~*	–	–	–	–	–	–	–	–	–	–	–	–	–
Western Reserve	–	–	–	–	–	–	–	–	–	–	–	–	–
Baldwin Wallace	–	–	–	–	–	–	–	–	–	–	–	–	–
Case	–	–	–	–	–	–	–	–	–	–	–	–	–
Fenn	–	–	–	–	–	–	–	–	–	–	–	–	–
† indicates division regular season champion ~ indicates division tournament champion * indicates conference tournament champion

== Schedule and results ==
Date	Opponent	Site	Result	Record
Regular Season
December 3	vs. Duquesne	Duquesne Garden • Pittsburgh, Pennsylvania	W 2–1	
January 2	Yale*	Duquesne Garden • Pittsburgh, Pennsylvania	L 0–11	
January 19	vs. Duquesne	Duquesne Garden • Pittsburgh, Pennsylvania	L 0–3	
February 14	vs. Duquesne	Duquesne Garden • Pittsburgh, Pennsylvania	L 2–3	
March 7	vs. Duquesne	Duquesne Garden • Pittsburgh, Pennsylvania	L 2–3 ^{forfeit}	
?	Baldwin Wallace	Duquesne Garden • Pittsburgh, Pennsylvania	W ?	
?	at Baldwin Wallace	Cleveland Arena • Cleveland, Ohio	W ?	
?	vs. Carnegie Tech	Duquesne Garden • Pittsburgh, Pennsylvania	W ?	
?	vs. Carnegie Tech	Duquesne Garden • Pittsburgh, Pennsylvania	W ?	
?	vs. Carnegie Tech	Duquesne Garden • Pittsburgh, Pennsylvania	W ?	
?	vs. Carnegie Tech	Duquesne Garden • Pittsburgh, Pennsylvania	T ?	
?	Case	Duquesne Garden • Pittsburgh, Pennsylvania	W ?	
?	at Case	Cleveland Arena • Cleveland, Ohio	W ?	
?	Fenn	Duquesne Garden • Pittsburgh, Pennsylvania	W ?	
?	at Fenn	Cleveland Arena • Cleveland, Ohio	W ?	
?	John Carroll	Duquesne Garden • Pittsburgh, Pennsylvania	T 2–2	
?	at John Carroll	Cleveland Arena • Cleveland, Ohio	L 1–3	
?	Western Reserve	Duquesne Garden • Pittsburgh, Pennsylvania	W ?	
?	at Western Reserve	Cleveland Arena • Cleveland, Ohio	W ?	
Penn-Ohio League Playoffs
March 22	vs. Duquesne*	Duquesne Garden • Pittsburgh, Pennsylvania (Eastern Division Game 1)	L 2–3	12–6–2
March ?	vs. Duquesne*	Duquesne Garden • Pittsburgh, Pennsylvania (Eastern Division Game 2)	T 1–1 ^{5OT}	12–6–3
March ?	vs. Duquesne*	Duquesne Garden • Pittsburgh, Pennsylvania (Eastern Division Game 3)	W 3–1	13–6–3
April ?	vs. Duquesne*	Duquesne Garden • Pittsburgh, Pennsylvania (Eastern Division Game 4)	W 2–1	14–6–3
Pittsburgh Won Series 2–1–1
April ?	John Carroll*	Duquesne Garden • Pittsburgh, Pennsylvania (Championship Game 1)	L 2–3	14–7–3
April ?	at John Carroll*	Cleveland Arena • Cleveland, Ohio (Championship Game 2)	L 2–3	14–8–3
Pittsburgh Lost Series 0–2
*Non-conference game.

Note: the score and date of most games are missing, however, the outcomes and overall record are available in the university yearbook.
