= Brooklyn Crescents (EHL) =

- City: Brooklyn, New York
- League: Eastern Amateur Hockey League
- Operated: 1943–1944
- Home arena: Brooklyn Ice Palace

The Brooklyn Crescents were a minor professional ice hockey team based in Brooklyn, New York. The team played at the Brooklyn Ice Palace for one season during World War II.

== History ==
In 1943, the Eastern Amateur Hockey League began the year with five teams, losing three form the previous year due to the war. By early December, two of the franchises had withdrawn, leaving just three clubs left in operation. Knowing that the league could not survive with so few teams, the league swiftly cobbled together a fourth team and called it the 'Brooklyn Crescents'. The roster was made up entirely of players donated from the other three teams, much to the chagrin of the players themselves. The team immediately assumed the place of the New Haven Eagles and entered the league on December 5. Brooklyn ended up with a terrible record, winning just 5 of their 45 games. During their lone season, the team was coached by 5 different people, all of whom were on temporary loan from the New York Rangers. Among that group were the team's leading scorer, Hank D'Amore, as well as Hockey Hall of Famers Frank Boucher and Lester Patrick.

== Season-by-season record ==
Note: GP = Games played, W = Wins, L = Losses, T = Ties, Pts = Points, GF = Goals for, GA = Goals against

| Season | GP | W | L | T | Pts | GF | GA | Finish | Coach | Playoffs |
|---|---|---|---|---|---|---|---|---|---|---|
| 1943–44 | 45 | 5 | 34 | 6 | 16 | - | - | 4th | Hank D'Amore / Tom Dewar / Frank Boucher / Lester Patrick / Howie McHugh | none |
