= 1938–39 United States collegiate men's ice hockey season =

- Duration: December 1938– March 1939
- East Collegiate champion: Dartmouth
- West Collegiate champion: Minnesota

The 1938–39 United States collegiate men's ice hockey season was the 45th season of collegiate ice hockey in the United States.

== Regular season ==
=== Season tournaments ===
Tournament	Dates	Teams	Champion
Lake Placid Invitational Tournament	December 26–28	8	Williams

=== Standings ===
1938–39 Eastern Collegiate ice hockey standings
	Intercollegiate							Overall					
	GP	W	L	T	Pct.	GF	GA	GP	W	L	T	GF	GA
Army	–	–	–	–	–	–	–	10	6	4	0	33	19
Boston College	–	–	–	–	–	–	–	16	9	7	0	76	80
Boston University	14	10	4	0	.714	80	67	14	10	4	0	80	67
Bowdoin	–	–	–	–	–	–	–	10	6	4	0	–	–
Brown	–	–	–	–	–	–	–	13	6	7	0	–	–
Clarkson	–	–	–	–	–	–	–	22	8	12	2	85	86
Colgate	–	–	–	–	–	–	–	9	8	1	0	–	–
Cornell	6	2	4	0	.333	19	21	6	2	4	0	19	21
Dartmouth	–	–	–	–	–	–	–	21	17	4	0	118	51
Hamilton	–	–	–	–	–	–	–	11	5	6	0	–	–
Harvard	–	–	–	–	–	–	–	15	7	7	1	–	–
Massachusetts State	–	–	–	–	–	–	–	5	0	4	1	–	–
Middlebury	–	–	–	–	–	–	–	14	5	9	0	–	–
MIT	–	–	–	–	–	–	–	15	3	12	0	–	–
New Hampshire	–	–	–	–	–	–	–	9	5	4	0	36	26
Northeastern	–	–	–	–	–	–	–	14	8	6	0	–	–
Norwich	–	–	–	–	–	–	–	4	1	3	0	–	–
Princeton	–	–	–	–	–	–	–	21	11	10	0	–	–
St. Lawrence	–	–	–	–	–	–	–	6	0	6	0	–	–
Union	–	–	–	–	–	–	–	5	2	3	0	–	–
Williams	–	–	–	–	–	–	–	10	5	5	0	–	–
Yale	–	–	–	–	–	–	–	20	9	10	1	–	–

1938–39 Western Collegiate ice hockey standings
	Intercollegiate							Overall					
	GP	W	L	T	Pct.	GF	GA	GP	W	L	T	GF	GA
Alaska-Fairbanks	–	–	–	–	–	–	–	3	1	1	1	–	–
Colorado College	–	–	–	–	–	–	–	11	8	3	0	–	–
Illinois	7	0	7	0	.000	5	43	10	3	7	0	15	45
Michigan	–	–	–	–	–	–	–	18	8	8	2	54	63
Michigan Tech	–	–	–	–	–	–	–	14	6	8	0	–	–
Minnesota	–	–	–	–	–	–	–	23	17	6	0	–	–

1938–39 Minnesota Intercollegiate Athletic Conference ice hockey standings
	Conference							Overall					
	GP	W	L	T	PTS	GF	GA	GP	W	L	T	GF	GA
Macalester †	–	–	–	–	–	–	–	–	–	–	–	–	–
St. Olaf †	–	–	–	–	–	–	–	10	9	1	0	–	–
Augsburg	–	–	–	–	–	–	–	–	–	–	–	–	–
Hamline	–	–	–	–	–	–	–	–	–	–	–	–	–
Gustavus Adolphus	–	–	–	–	–	–	–	11	6	5	0	–	–
Saint John's	–	–	–	–	–	–	–	9	1	6	2	–	–
St. Thomas	–	–	–	–	–	–	–	10	4	5	1	–	–
† indicates conference champion

1938–39 Pacific Coast Conference ice hockey standings
	Conference							Overall					
	GP	W	L	T	PTS	GF	GA	GP	W	L	T	GF	GA
California	–	–	–	–	–	–	–	–	–	–	–	–	–
Gonzaga	–	–	–	–	–	–	–	13	6	7	0	–	–
Loyola	–	–	–	–	–	–	–	–	–	–	–	–	–
UCLA	–	–	–	–	–	–	–	–	–	–	–	–	–
USC	–	–	–	–	–	–	–	–	–	–	–	–	–
Washington	–	–	–	–	–	–	–	–	–	–	–	–	–
* indicates conference champion

1938–39 Penn-Ohio Intercollegiate Hockey League standings
	Conference							Overall					
	GP	W	L	T	PTS	GF	GA	GP	W	L	T	GF	GA
East
Duquesne †	18	17	1	0	34	68	12	22	18	3	1	74	20
Pittsburgh ~	18	12	4	2	26	43	18	25	14	8	3	55	41
Carnegie Tech	–	–	–	–	–	–	–	–	–	–	–	–	–
West
John Carroll †~*	–	–	–	–	–	–	–	–	–	–	–	–	–
Western Reserve	–	–	–	–	–	–	–	–	–	–	–	–	–
Baldwin Wallace	–	–	–	–	–	–	–	–	–	–	–	–	–
Case	–	–	–	–	–	–	–	–	–	–	–	–	–
Fenn	–	–	–	–	–	–	–	–	–	–	–	–	–
† indicates division regular season champion ~ indicates division tournament champion * indicates conference tournament champion
