= 1937–38 United States collegiate men's ice hockey season =

- Duration: December 1937– March 1938
- East Collegiate champion: Clarkson
- West Collegiate champion: None

The 1937–38 United States collegiate men's ice hockey season was the 44th season of collegiate ice hockey in the United States.

== Regular season ==
=== Standings ===
1937–38 Eastern Collegiate ice hockey standings
	Intercollegiate							Overall					
	GP	W	L	T	Pct.	GF	GA	GP	W	L	T	GF	GA
Army	–	–	–	–	–	–	–	10	5	4	1	29	21
Boston College	–	–	–	–	–	–	–	15	9	6	0	75	56
Boston University	15	9	4	2	.667	88	61	15	9	4	2	88	61
Bowdoin	–	–	–	–	–	–	–	12	6	6	0	–	–
Brown	–	–	–	–	–	–	–	14	5	9	0	–	–
Clarkson	–	–	–	–	–	–	–	15	13	1	1	105	34
Colgate	–	–	–	–	–	–	–	7	3	4	0	–	–
Columbia	2	0	2	0	.000	1	9	11	2	8	1	17	42
Cornell	4	0	4	0	.000	4	17	4	0	4	0	4	17
Dartmouth	–	–	–	–	–	–	–	22	18	4	0	105	78
Hamilton	–	–	–	–	–	–	–	9	5	4	0	–	–
Harvard	–	–	–	–	–	–	–	14	6	7	1	–	–
Lafayette	1	0	1	0	.000	0	5	2	1	1	0	5	7
Massachusetts State	–	–	–	–	–	–	–	7	2	4	1	–	–
Middlebury	–	–	–	–	–	–	–	11	2	7	2	–	–
MIT	–	–	–	–	–	–	–	12	6	6	0	–	–
New Hampshire	–	–	–	–	–	–	–	10	6	3	1	69	41
Northeastern	–	–	–	–	–	–	–	13	3	9	1	–	–
Princeton	–	–	–	–	–	–	–	18	5	12	1	–	–
Rensselaer	–	–	–	–	–	–	–	3	0	3	0	–	–
Union	–	–	–	–	–	–	–	4	0	3	1	–	–
Williams	–	–	–	–	–	–	–	14	10	3	1	–	–
Yale	–	–	–	–	–	–	–	18	7	10	1	–	–

1937–38 Western Collegiate ice hockey standings
	Intercollegiate							Overall					
	GP	W	L	T	Pct.	GF	GA	GP	W	L	T	GF	GA
Alaska-Fairbanks	–	–	–	–	–	–	–	3	2	1	0	–	–
Colorado College	–	–	–	–	–	–	–	12	3	9	0	–	–
Illinois	2	0	2	0	.000	3	15	4	0	4	0	5	20
Michigan	–	–	–	–	–	–	–	19	13	6	0	70	41
Michigan Tech	–	–	–	–	–	–	–	16	4	11	1	–	–
Minnesota	–	–	–	–	–	–	–	17	7	9	1	–	–

1937–38 Minnesota Intercollegiate Athletic Conference ice hockey standings
	Conference							Overall					
	GP	W	L	T	PTS	GF	GA	GP	W	L	T	GF	GA
St. Olaf †	–	–	–	–	–	–	–	12	8	3	1	–	–
St. Thomas †	–	–	–	–	–	–	–	12	9	2	1	–	–
Augsburg	–	–	–	–	–	–	–	–	–	–	–	–	–
Hamline	–	–	–	–	–	–	–	–	–	–	–	–	–
Gustavus Adolphus	–	–	–	–	–	–	–	5	0	5	0	–	–
Macalester	–	–	–	–	–	–	–	–	–	–	–	–	–
Saint John's	–	–	–	–	–	–	–	8	4	4	0	–	–
† indicates conference champion

1937–38 Pacific Coast Conference ice hockey standings
	Conference							Overall					
	GP	W	L	T	PTS	GF	GA	GP	W	L	T	GF	GA
California	–	–	–	–	–	–	–	–	–	–	–	–	–
Gonzaga	–	–	–	–	–	–	–	21	15	3	3	–	–
Loyola	–	–	–	–	–	–	–	–	–	–	–	–	–
UCLA	–	–	–	–	–	–	–	–	–	–	–	–	–
USC	–	–	–	–	–	–	–	–	–	–	–	–	–
Washington	–	–	–	–	–	–	–	–	–	–	–	–	–
* indicates conference champion

1937–38 Penn-Ohio Intercollegiate Hockey League standings
	Conference							Overall					
	GP	W	L	T	PTS	GF	GA	GP	W	L	T	GF	GA
East
Duquesne †	12	10	2	0	20	41	14	14	11	3	0	42	17
Pittsburgh ~	12	9	2	1	19	–	–	17	10	6	1	–	–
Carnegie Tech	12	3	8	1	7	16	29	12	3	8	1	16	29
West
John Carroll †~*	12	10	1	1	21	54	12	16	13	1	2	64	16
Western Reserve	–	–	–	–	–	–	–	–	–	–	–	–	–
Fenn	12	2	9	1	5	–	–	–	–	–	–	–	–
Baldwin Wallace	–	–	–	–	–	–	–	–	–	–	–	–	–
† indicates division regular season champion ~ indicates division tournament champion * indicates conference tournament champion
