= 1937–38 Columbia Lions men's ice hockey season =

- Home ice: Brooklyn Ice Palace

Record
- Overall: 2–8–1
- Home: 2–4–1
- Road: 0–4–0

Coaches and captains
- Captain(s): Chris McFadden; Alex Green

The 1937–38 Columbia men's ice hockey season was the 23rd season of play for the program.

== Season ==
After resuscitating the squad in the mid-30's as a club team, Columbia's ice hockey program received approval from the administration for the first time in 14 years. The team was led by senior captain Chris MacFadden who had been a driving force behind the team's return. The Lions were hoping to get an early start on the year and begin practicing before Thanksgiving, however, ruptured pipes at the Brooklyn Ice Palace forced the team to wait until the beginning of December. Even without the issues, Columbia would have been hard pressed to defeat their first opponent of the season. Dartmouth was one of the top programs in the country and were full of players used to facing difficult opposition. The predictions bore out in Columbia's 0–7 loss while goaltender Alex Green was credited with holding the Indians scoreless in the first period.

Columbia's schedule didn't get any easier as their next game was against defending east intercollegiate champion Harvard just after Christmas. The match was eventually cancelled, however, and put the team on the shelf for a week. upon their return to campus, the Lions took on the Long Island Saltons, a local amateur club, and played a hard defensive game. The team earned a tie and were hoping that the result was a sign of improvement for the Blues. Jack Mitchell's scored Columbia's first goal of the season. Two days later the Lions suffered another lopsided loss, but their opponent, the St. Nicholas Hockey Club, had performed a similar feat on three other top collegiate teams so the loss didn't sting quite so much.

In Columbia's next game, the team was able to demonstrate that their defense was worthy of praise by holding the New York Athletic Club to just a single goal. Unfortunately, the Lions weren't able to score themselves, and lost their third game of the season. The next recorded match came against Army after the semester break and, despite playing most of the game tied, the Cadets pulled ahead in the third and won 3–1 (Army records do not include this game so its likely that the Lions played the JV squad). The following weekend, the team lost another game to an amateur team, doing so without the services of their captain. When the team played their second game of the week the offense finally made an appearance. The Lions netted 6 goals but it was one too few and Columbia lost their rematch with the New York Athletic Club.

Columbia ended a hectic week with back-to-back meeting on Friday and Saturday night. The first game saw the Lions earn their first win of the season, downing the Long Island Falcons on the strength of a Bill Shanahan goal. Their jubilation was curtailed the following evening when they were blanked by Princeton. To make matters worse, they weren't even facing the primary Tigers' team and had lost to the junior-varsity squad.

The team's second win on the year came in the first round of the New York Amateur Hockey Association tournament, where they once again downed the Falcons. Columbia's final game of the season came against Brown and the team put up a valiant effort but were unable to come out on top.

The following season, Columbia attempted to put a team together, but without the McFadden and McMahon nothing came to fruition. Any games that the program scheduled were eventually cancelled and Columbia has yet to play another varsity game (as of 2021).

== Roster ==
No.	Nat.	Player	Class	Pos	Height	Weight	DoB	Hometown	Previous team
		Button		LW
		Bob Case		C
		Sam Calkins		C
		Faugat
		Alex Green		G
		Hall		D
		Dick Hay
		Glen Hersey		D
		Ed Horn		C/LW/RW
		Kerrigan
		Chris McFadden (C)	Senior	RW
		Jack McMahon	Senior	D
		Jack Mitchell		LW
		Julian Rice
		Tom Rothwell
		Bill Shanahan		D
		Ed Wilken		D

== Standings ==
1937–38 Eastern Collegiate ice hockey standings
	Intercollegiate							Overall					
	GP	W	L	T	Pct.	GF	GA	GP	W	L	T	GF	GA
Army	–	–	–	–	–	–	–	10	5	4	1	29	21
Boston College	–	–	–	–	–	–	–	15	9	6	0	75	56
Boston University	15	9	4	2	.667	88	61	15	9	4	2	88	61
Bowdoin	–	–	–	–	–	–	–	12	6	6	0	–	–
Brown	–	–	–	–	–	–	–	14	5	9	0	–	–
Clarkson	–	–	–	–	–	–	–	15	13	1	1	105	34
Colgate	–	–	–	–	–	–	–	7	3	4	0	–	–
Columbia	2	0	2	0	.000	1	9	11	2	8	1	17	42
Cornell	4	0	4	0	.000	4	17	4	0	4	0	4	17
Dartmouth	–	–	–	–	–	–	–	22	18	4	0	105	78
Hamilton	–	–	–	–	–	–	–	9	5	4	0	–	–
Harvard	–	–	–	–	–	–	–	14	6	7	1	–	–
Lafayette	1	0	1	0	.000	0	5	2	1	1	0	5	7
Massachusetts State	–	–	–	–	–	–	–	7	2	4	1	–	–
Middlebury	–	–	–	–	–	–	–	11	2	7	2	–	–
MIT	–	–	–	–	–	–	–	12	6	6	0	–	–
New Hampshire	–	–	–	–	–	–	–	10	6	3	1	69	41
Northeastern	–	–	–	–	–	–	–	13	3	9	1	–	–
Princeton	–	–	–	–	–	–	–	18	5	12	1	–	–
Rensselaer	–	–	–	–	–	–	–	3	0	3	0	–	–
Union	–	–	–	–	–	–	–	4	0	3	1	–	–
Williams	–	–	–	–	–	–	–	14	10	3	1	–	–
Yale	–	–	–	–	–	–	–	18	7	10	1	–	–

== Schedule and results ==
Date	Opponent	Site	Result	Record
Regular season
December 11	at Dartmouth*	Davis Rink • Hanover, New Hampshire	L 0–7	0–1–0
January 4	Long Island Saltons*	Brooklyn Ice Palace • Brooklyn, New York	T 1–1	0–1–1
January 6	vs. St. Nicholas Hockey Club*	Brooklyn Ice Palace • Brooklyn, New York	L 2–10	0–2–1
January 11	New York Athletic Club*	Brooklyn Ice Palace • Brooklyn, New York	L 0–1	0–3–1
January 29^{†}	at Army*	Smith Rink • West Point, New York	L 1–3	0–4–1
February 6	vs. Brooklyn Bruins*	Brooklyn Ice Palace • Brooklyn, New York	L 1–4	0–5–1
February 8	New York Athletic Club*	Brooklyn Ice Palace • Brooklyn, New York	L 6–7	0–6–1
February 11	Long Island Falcons*	Brooklyn Ice Palace • Brooklyn, New York	W 2–1	1–6–1
February 12	at Princeton Junior Varsity*	Hobey Baker Memorial Rink • Princeton, New Jersey	L 0–5	1–7–1
February 19	Long Island Falcons*	Brooklyn Ice Palace • Brooklyn, New York (NYAHA First Round)	W 3–1	2–7–1
March 1	at Brown*	Rhode Island Auditorium • Providence, Rhode Island	L 1–2	2–8–1
*Non-conference game.

† Army records do not include a game against Columbia in 1938.
