= 1906–07 RPI men's ice hockey season =

- Conference: Independent

Record
- Overall: 2–1–0
- Road: 2–1–0

Coaches and captains
- Captain: Conrad Hammann

The 1906–07 RPI men's ice hockey season was the 4th season of play for the program.

== Season ==
After a two-year absence the RPI ice hockey team returned to varsity status and put together its first season of more than one game. Rensselaer's first two games came at the end of December on a visit to Pittsburgh where they split against local universities. The next match didn't happen for over a month but when they hit the ice again the cherries were able to defeat Army to finish with a winning record.

Note: Rensselaer's athletic teams were unofficially known as 'Cherry and White' until 1921 when the Engineers moniker debuted for the men's basketball team.

== Roster ==
No.	Nat.	Player	Class	Pos	Height	Weight	DoB	Hometown	Previous team
		Conrad Hammann (C)

== Standings ==
1906–07 Collegiate ice hockey standings
	Intercollegiate							Overall					
	GP	W	L	T	PCT.	GF	GA	GP	W	L	T	GF	GA
Army	3	1	2	0	.333	2	6	9	3	6	0	15	27
Carnegie Tech	2	1	1	0	.500	1	2	–	–	–	–	–	–
Columbia	4	0	4	0	.000	4	17	5	0	5	0	4	28
Cornell	2	2	0	0	1.000	11	0	2	2	0	0	11	0
Dartmouth	5	3	2	0	.600	15	20	7	5	2	0	30	25
Harvard	6	5	1	0	.833	49	11	10	8	2	0	66	21
MIT	4	1	3	0	.250	4	17	7	3	4	0	19	26
Princeton	4	4	0	0	1.000	14	6	8	5	3	0	20	25
Rensselaer	3	2	1	0	.667	4	2	3	2	1	0	4	2
Rochester	–	–	–	–	–	–	–	–	–	–	–	–	–
Springfield Training	–	–	–	–	–	–	–	–	–	–	–	–	–
Trinity	–	–	–	–	–	–	–	–	–	–	–	–	–
Union	–	–	–	–	–	–	–	1	1	0	0	–	–
Western University of Pennsylvania	2	0	2	0	.000	0	3	2	0	2	0	0	3
Williams	2	0	2	0	.000	3	5	5	1	4	0	12	17
Yale	6	3	3	0	.500	13	12	9	3	6	0	15	20

== Schedule and results ==
Date	Opponent	Site	Result	Record
Regular Season
December 28	at Western University of Pennsylvania*	Duquesne Garden • Pittsburgh, Pennsylvania	W 2–0	1–0–0
December 29	at Carnegie Tech*	Duquesne Garden • Pittsburgh, Pennsylvania	L 0–1	1–1–0
February 9	at Army*	Lusk Reservoir • West Point, New York	W 2–1	2–1–0
*Non-conference game.
