= 1906–07 Columbia men's ice hockey season =

- Conference: 5th IHA
- Home ice: St. Nicholas Rink

Record
- Overall: 0–5–0
- Conference: 0–4–0
- Home: 0–4–0
- Neutral: 0–1–0

Coaches and captains
- Head coach: J. C. Coolican
- Assistant coaches: Rudolph von Bernuth
- Captain: David Armstrong

The 1906–07 Columbia men's ice hockey season was the 11th season of play for the program.

== Season ==
Coolican served as coach while former player Rudolph Von Bernuth acted as his assistant. H. T. Applington served as team manager.

Note: Columbia University adopted the Lion as its mascot in 1910.

== Roster ==
No.	Nat.	Player	Class	Pos	Height	Weight	DoB	Hometown	Previous team
		David Armstrong (C)	Senior	F
		Lathrop Bartow	Sophomore	F
		Albert Borchardt	Sophomore	F
		Carlton Dederer	Graduate	F/D
		Kerner Easton	Graduate	G
		Charles Jackson	Senior	F/D
		Clarence King	Junior	F
		George Mackenzie	Junior	F/D
		James Mackenzie	Freshman	F
		George Shafer	Sophomore	F
		Henry Taylor	Graduate	D
		Benjamin Willis	Sophomore	D

== Standings ==
1906–07 Collegiate ice hockey standings
	Intercollegiate							Overall					
	GP	W	L	T	PCT.	GF	GA	GP	W	L	T	GF	GA
Army	3	1	2	0	.333	2	6	9	3	6	0	15	27
Carnegie Tech	2	1	1	0	.500	1	2	–	–	–	–	–	–
Columbia	4	0	4	0	.000	4	17	5	0	5	0	4	28
Cornell	2	2	0	0	1.000	11	0	2	2	0	0	11	0
Dartmouth	5	3	2	0	.600	15	20	7	5	2	0	30	25
Harvard	6	5	1	0	.833	49	11	10	8	2	0	66	21
MIT	4	1	3	0	.250	4	17	7	3	4	0	19	26
Princeton	4	4	0	0	1.000	14	6	8	5	3	0	20	25
Rensselaer	3	2	1	0	.667	4	2	3	2	1	0	4	2
Rochester	–	–	–	–	–	–	–	–	–	–	–	–	–
Springfield Training	–	–	–	–	–	–	–	–	–	–	–	–	–
Trinity	–	–	–	–	–	–	–	–	–	–	–	–	–
Union	–	–	–	–	–	–	–	1	1	0	0	–	–
Western University of Pennsylvania	2	0	2	0	.000	0	3	2	0	2	0	0	3
Williams	2	0	2	0	.000	3	5	5	1	4	0	12	17
Yale	6	3	3	0	.500	13	12	9	3	6	0	15	20

1906–07 Intercollegiate Hockey Association standings
	Conference							Overall					
	GP	W	L	T	PTS	GF	GA	GP	W	L	T	GF	GA
Princeton *	4	4	0	0	8	14	6	8	5	3	0	20	25
Harvard	4	3	1	0	6	25	9	10	8	2	0	66	21
Dartmouth	4	2	2	0	4	12	18	7	5	2	0	30	25
Yale	4	1	3	0	2	9	12	9	3	6	0	15	20
Columbia	4	0	4	0	0	4	17	5	0	5	0	4	28
* indicates conference champion

== Schedule and results ==
Date	Opponent	Site	Result	Record
Regular Season
December 18	vs. St. Nicholas Hockey Club*	St. Nicholas Rink • New York, New York	L 0–11	0–1–0
January 5	Princeton	St. Nicholas Rink • New York, New York	L 0–3	0–2–0 (0–1–0)
January 13	Harvard	St. Nicholas Rink • New York, New York	L 0–7	0–3–0 (0–2–0)
January 18	Dartmouth	St. Nicholas Rink • New York, New York	L 1–3	0–4–0 (0–3–0)
January 27	Yale	St. Nicholas Rink • New York, New York	L 3–4 ^{OT}	0–5–0 (0–4–0)
*Non-conference game.
