= 1906–07 Princeton Tigers men's ice hockey season =

Intercollegiate Champion Intercollegiate Hockey Association, Champion
- Conference: 1st IHA

Record
- Overall: 5–3–0
- Conference: 4–0–0
- Road: 2–3–0
- Neutral: 3–0–0

Coaches and captains
- Head coach: Tom Howard
- Captain: Afton Zahniser

The 1906–07 Princeton Tigers men's ice hockey season was the 8th season of play for the program.

== Season ==
Beginning with this season the undergraduates at Princeton were limited to just two sports during one school year. As a result, several players who had tried out for the team in recent years were ineligible to play for the ice hockey team. Despite this setback the team was well represented with many returning members from a year before. Counterbalancing the dearth of players was the team's new practice facility located on Lake Carnegie, the first home venue the Tigers' possessed. After a decent showing in three early games Princeton had to cancel it's Holiday road trip to Norfolk, Virginia and were limited to a single practice game over the winter break. While there was worry that the lack of play would inhibit the team's ability to compete against conference opponents, the Tigers won both games in early January. The fast start was then buoyed by the addition of Thomas Howard as coach.

Princeton's third conference game came to define their season as the Tigers were able to take down four-time defending champion Harvard 4–3. The victory was the first for Princeton over the Crimson and set the icers up for a chance at their first championship. In their final game against Yale the teams battled fairly evenly throughout the extended game (25-minute halves were used rather than the normal 20-minute halves) but a goal by Joshua Brush put the Tigers ahead for good and gave Princeton its first Intercollegiate Hockey Association Championship.

J.G. Thomas served as team manager with F. Leake as his assistant.

== Roster ==
No.	Nat.	Player	Class	Pos	Height	Weight	DoB	Hometown	Previous team
		Oscar Auerbach	Sophomore	F
		Joshua Brush	Sophomore	F
		Philip Chew	Senior	F
		John Chislett	Senior	G
		Charles Coxe	Sophomore	F/D
		Chester Levis	Senior	F
		Ralph Osborne	Junior	F
		Harral Tenney	Senior	D
		Afton Zahniser (C)	Senior	D

== Standings ==
1906–07 Collegiate ice hockey standings
	Intercollegiate							Overall					
	GP	W	L	T	PCT.	GF	GA	GP	W	L	T	GF	GA
Army	3	1	2	0	.333	2	6	9	3	6	0	15	27
Carnegie Tech	2	1	1	0	.500	1	2	–	–	–	–	–	–
Columbia	4	0	4	0	.000	4	17	5	0	5	0	4	28
Cornell	2	2	0	0	1.000	11	0	2	2	0	0	11	0
Dartmouth	5	3	2	0	.600	15	20	7	5	2	0	30	25
Harvard	6	5	1	0	.833	49	11	10	8	2	0	66	21
MIT	4	1	3	0	.250	4	17	7	3	4	0	19	26
Princeton	4	4	0	0	1.000	14	6	8	5	3	0	20	25
Rensselaer	3	2	1	0	.667	4	2	3	2	1	0	4	2
Rochester	–	–	–	–	–	–	–	–	–	–	–	–	–
Springfield Training	–	–	–	–	–	–	–	–	–	–	–	–	–
Trinity	–	–	–	–	–	–	–	–	–	–	–	–	–
Union	–	–	–	–	–	–	–	1	1	0	0	–	–
Western University of Pennsylvania	2	0	2	0	.000	0	3	2	0	2	0	0	3
Williams	2	0	2	0	.000	3	5	5	1	4	0	12	17
Yale	6	3	3	0	.500	13	12	9	3	6	0	15	20

1906–07 Intercollegiate Hockey Association standings
	Conference							Overall					
	GP	W	L	T	PTS	GF	GA	GP	W	L	T	GF	GA
Princeton *	4	4	0	0	8	14	6	8	5	3	0	20	25
Harvard	4	3	1	0	6	25	9	10	8	2	0	66	21
Dartmouth	4	2	2	0	4	12	18	7	5	2	0	30	25
Yale	4	1	3	0	2	9	12	9	3	6	0	15	20
Columbia	4	0	4	0	0	4	17	5	0	5	0	4	28
* indicates conference champion

== Schedule and results ==
Date	Opponent	Site	Result	Record
Regular Season
December 12	at Lawrenceville School*	Lawrenceville, New Jersey	W 2–0	1–0–0
December 13	at New York Hockey Club*	St. Nicholas Rink • New York, New York	L 1–7	1–1–0
December 14	at New York Athletic Club*	St. Nicholas Rink • New York, New York	L 1–2	1–2–0
January 2	at St. Nicholas Hockey Club*	St. Nicholas Rink • New York, New York	L 2–10	1–3–0
January 5	at Columbia	St. Nicholas Rink • New York, New York	W 3–0	2–3–0 (1–0–0)
January 9	vs. Dartmouth	St. Nicholas Rink • New York, New York	W 5–2	3–3–0 (2–0–0)
January 19	vs. Harvard	St. Nicholas Rink • New York, New York	W 4–3	4–3–0 (3–0–0)
February 9	vs. Yale	St. Nicholas Rink • New York, New York	W 2–1	5–3–0 (4–0–0)
*Non-conference game.
