= 1937–38 Lafayette Leopards men's ice hockey season =

1937-38 Lafayette Leopards men's ice hockey season
- Conference: Independent

Record
- Overall: 1–1–0
- Road: 0–1–0
- Neutral: 1–0–0

Coaches and captains
- Head coach: Henry W. Clark; Dale H. Moore

The 1937–38 Lafayette Leopards men's ice hockey season was the 2nd season of play for the program. The Leopards represented Lafayette College and were coached by Henry W. Clark and Dale H. Moore in their 2nd seasons.

== Season ==
Just like the first season, Lafayette got a late start to the year and didn't play their first match until late February. Similarly, after losing their opening match, the Leopards won the second game against Lehigh at Skytop.

While there was enthusiasm from student body to keep the program going, the school decided against financially supporting the program and it was downgraded to unofficial status for the following year.

== Roster ==
| No. | Nat. | Player | Class | Pos | Height | Weight | DoB | Hometown | Previous team |
|---|---|---|---|---|---|---|---|---|---|
| | | John Allen | Sophomore |
| | | Nils Askman | | F |
| | | Tony Cavallo | Junior | F |
| | | Clark | | F |
| | | Bill Farinon | Junior | G |
| | | Bud Henderson | Sophomore | D |
| | (Canada) | Frank Murphy | Sophomore | F | | | | Montreal, Quebec |
| | | Bud Pease | Sophomore | F |
| | | Edward Ricci | Junior | D |
| | | Jack Sargent |
| | | Charlie Scofield | Junior | D |
| | | Marvin Sterencier | | D |
| | | Norbert Weldon | Junior |

== Standings ==
1937–38 Eastern Collegiate ice hockey standings
| | Intercollegiate | | | | | | | Overall | | | | | |
| | GP | W | L | T | Pct. | GF | GA | GP | W | L | T | GF | GA |
|---|---|---|---|---|---|---|---|---|---|---|---|---|---|
| Army | – | – | – | – | – | – | – | 10 | 5 | 4 | 1 | 29 | 21 |
| Boston College | – | – | – | – | – | – | – | 15 | 9 | 6 | 0 | 75 | 56 |
| Boston University | 15 | 9 | 4 | 2 | .667 | 88 | 61 | 15 | 9 | 4 | 2 | 88 | 61 |
| Bowdoin | – | – | – | – | – | – | – | 12 | 6 | 6 | 0 | – | – |
| Brown | – | – | – | – | – | – | – | 14 | 5 | 9 | 0 | – | – |
| Clarkson | – | – | – | – | – | – | – | 15 | 13 | 1 | 1 | 105 | 34 |
| Colgate | – | – | – | – | – | – | – | 7 | 3 | 4 | 0 | – | – |
| Columbia | 2 | 0 | 2 | 0 | .000 | 1 | 9 | 11 | 2 | 8 | 1 | 17 | 42 |
| Cornell | 4 | 0 | 4 | 0 | .000 | 4 | 17 | 4 | 0 | 4 | 0 | 4 | 17 |
| Dartmouth | – | – | – | – | – | – | – | 22 | 18 | 4 | 0 | 105 | 78 |
| Hamilton | – | – | – | – | – | – | – | 9 | 5 | 4 | 0 | – | – |
| Harvard | – | – | – | – | – | – | – | 14 | 6 | 7 | 1 | – | – |
| Lafayette | 1 | 0 | 1 | 0 | .000 | 0 | 5 | 2 | 1 | 1 | 0 | 5 | 7 |
| Massachusetts State | – | – | – | – | – | – | – | 7 | 2 | 4 | 1 | – | – |
| Middlebury | – | – | – | – | – | – | – | 11 | 2 | 7 | 2 | – | – |
| MIT | – | – | – | – | – | – | – | 12 | 6 | 6 | 0 | – | – |
| New Hampshire | – | – | – | – | – | – | – | 10 | 6 | 3 | 1 | 69 | 41 |
| Northeastern | – | – | – | – | – | – | – | 13 | 3 | 9 | 1 | – | – |
| Princeton | – | – | – | – | – | – | – | 18 | 5 | 12 | 1 | – | – |
| Rensselaer | – | – | – | – | – | – | – | 3 | 0 | 3 | 0 | – | – |
| Union | – | – | – | – | – | – | – | 4 | 0 | 3 | 1 | – | – |
| Williams | – | – | – | – | – | – | – | 14 | 10 | 3 | 1 | – | – |
| Yale | – | – | – | – | – | – | – | 18 | 7 | 10 | 1 | – | – |

== Schedule and results ==
| Date | Opponent | Site | Result | Record |
Regular Season
| February 21 | at Army* | Smith Rink • West Point, New York | L 0–5 | 0–1–0 |
| February 27 | vs. Lehigh* | Skytop Rink • Skytop, Pennsylvania | W 5–2 ^{OT} | 1–1–0 |
*Non-conference game. ^{#}Rankings from USCHO.com Poll.

== Scoring statistics ==
| Name | Position | Games | Goals | Assists | Points | PIM |
|---|---|---|---|---|---|---|
| Bud Kinne | C | 2 | 3 | - | - | - |
| Tony Cavallo | W | 2 | 2 | - | - | - |
| John Allyn | | 1 | 0 | - | - | - |
| Clark | F | 1 | 0 | - | - | - |
| Jack Sargent | | 1 | 0 | - | - | - |
| Norbert Weldon | | 1 | 0 | - | - | - |
| Nils Askman | F | 2 | 0 | - | - | - |
| Bill Farinon | G | 2 | 0 | - | - | - |
| Bud Henderson | D | 2 | 0 | - | - | - |
| Frank Murphy | W | 2 | 0 | - | - | - |
| Bud Peace | F | 2 | 0 | - | - | - |
| Edward Ricci | D | 2 | 0 | - | - | - |
| Charlie Scofield | D | 2 | 0 | - | - | - |
| Marvin Sterencier | D | 2 | 0 | - | - | - |
| Total | | | 5 | - | - | - |
