= 1938–39 Cornell Big Red men's ice hockey season =

Intercollegiate hockey season

- Home ice: Beebe Lake

Record
- Overall: 2–4–0
- Road: 0–3–0
- Neutral: 2–1–0

Coaches and captains
- Head coach: Nick Bawlf
- Captain: Al Bosson

The 1938–39 Cornell Big Red men's ice hockey season was the 32nd season of play for the program. The teams was coached by Nick Bawlf in his 17th season.

== Season ==
Cornell's season began with an early-season tournament at the Jack Shea Arena in Lake Placid. The team was forced to pay their own way to get to the cite and, due to several players living too far away during the Christmas break, the Big Red were handicapped before the games were even played. The meet took place between seven colleges but and was advertised as a 'practice tournament'. At the time the term was typically used to refer to games that would not be considered for rankings; in modern terminology, the games would have been non-conference rather than exhibition matches.

Despite being on ice for only half a dozen sessions, Cornell opened the tournament with a bang, throttling St. Lawrence 11–1. After defeating the ordinarily powerful Hamilton Continentals in the second game, Cornell finished their otherwise successful appearance with a narrow loss to Williams. Cornell was set to face Colgate immediately after returning from the break, however, rain and warm weather forced the match to be cancelled.

The lack of practice time degraded the team's effectiveness. When they travelled to play Clarkson, the Big Red were overpowered 1–9. While the defense would put forth a better effort in the team's final two games, the offense remained dormant and Cornell ended the year on a 4-game losing streak. Cornell had scheduled a match against Columbia in late January, their last chance for a home game, but the Lions ended up cancelling their entire season.

== Roster ==
No.	Nat.	Player	Class	Pos	Height	Weight	DoB	Hometown	Previous team
	(United States)	Glen Allen						Canandaigua, New York
	(United States)	Jack Babson	Sophomore	C				Yonkers, New York
	(United States)	Harry Bill						Greenfield, Massachusetts
	(United States)	Albert Bosson (C)	Senior	G				Cambridge, Massachusetts
	(Canada)	James Bostwick		RW			1917-05-26	Hamilton, Ontario
	(United States)	Ray McElwee	Junior	D				Ithaca, New York
		Carl Geiger
		Robert Killian
	(United States)	Harold Howe						Hartford, Connecticut
		Augustus Nicholls
		Patterson
	(United States)	Otto Porier						Minneapolis, Minnesota
	(United States)	Kenneth Reed	Sophomore	F			1920-05-21	Ithaca, New York
		Stan Roberts		RW
	(United States)	Robert Wiggans		D			1918-04-17	Ithaca, New York

== Standings ==
1938–39 Eastern Collegiate ice hockey standings
	Intercollegiate							Overall					
	GP	W	L	T	Pct.	GF	GA	GP	W	L	T	GF	GA
Army	–	–	–	–	–	–	–	10	6	4	0	33	19
Boston College	–	–	–	–	–	–	–	16	9	7	0	76	80
Boston University	14	10	4	0	.714	80	67	14	10	4	0	80	67
Bowdoin	–	–	–	–	–	–	–	10	6	4	0	–	–
Brown	–	–	–	–	–	–	–	13	6	7	0	–	–
Clarkson	–	–	–	–	–	–	–	22	8	12	2	85	86
Colgate	–	–	–	–	–	–	–	9	8	1	0	–	–
Cornell	6	2	4	0	.333	19	21	6	2	4	0	19	21
Dartmouth	–	–	–	–	–	–	–	21	17	4	0	118	51
Hamilton	–	–	–	–	–	–	–	11	5	6	0	–	–
Harvard	–	–	–	–	–	–	–	15	7	7	1	–	–
Massachusetts State	–	–	–	–	–	–	–	5	0	4	1	–	–
Middlebury	–	–	–	–	–	–	–	14	5	9	0	–	–
MIT	–	–	–	–	–	–	–	15	3	12	0	–	–
New Hampshire	–	–	–	–	–	–	–	9	5	4	0	36	26
Northeastern	–	–	–	–	–	–	–	14	8	6	0	–	–
Norwich	–	–	–	–	–	–	–	4	1	3	0	–	–
Princeton	–	–	–	–	–	–	–	21	11	10	0	–	–
St. Lawrence	–	–	–	–	–	–	–	6	0	6	0	–	–
Union	–	–	–	–	–	–	–	5	2	3	0	–	–
Williams	–	–	–	–	–	–	–	10	5	5	0	–	–
Yale	–	–	–	–	–	–	–	20	9	10	1	–	–

== Schedule and results ==
Date	Opponent	Site	Result	Record
Lake Placid Invitational Tournament
December 26	vs. St. Lawrence*	Jack Shea Arena • Lake Placid, New York (Quarterfinal)	W 11–1	1–0–0
December 27	vs. Hamilton*	Jack Shea Arena • Lake Placid, New York (Semifinal)	W 2–0	2–0–0
December 28	vs. Williams*	Jack Shea Arena • Lake Placid, New York (Championship)	L 3–4	2–1–0
Regular season
January 14	at Clarkson*	Ives Park • Potsdam, New York	L 1–9	0–2–0
January 19	at Colgate*	Hamilton, New York	L 1–3	2–3–0
February 26	at Army*	Smith Rink • West Point, New York	L 1–4	2–4–0
*Non-conference game.
