= 1906–07 MIT Engineers men's ice hockey season =

- Conference: Independent

Record
- Overall: 3–4–0

Coaches and captains
- Captain: Gardner Gould

The 1906–07 MIT Engineers men's ice hockey season was the 8th season of play for the program.

== Season ==
The team did not have a head coach but William Kelly served as team manager.

Note: Massachusetts Institute of Technology athletics were referred to as 'Engineers' or 'Techmen' during the first two decades of the 20th century. By 1920 all sports programs had adopted the Engineer moniker.

== Roster ==
No.	Nat.	Player	Class	Pos	Height	Weight	DoB	Hometown	Previous team
		Harold Billings	Freshman	G
		Joseph Coupal	Senior	F
		Luther Davis	Freshman	D
		Winthrop Ford	Junior	F
		Gardner Gould (C)	Senior	D
		William Kelly	Sophomore	F
		Addison Miller	Senior	F
		William O'Hearn	Freshman
		Arthur Tylee	Senior

== Standings ==
1906–07 Collegiate ice hockey standings
	Intercollegiate							Overall					
	GP	W	L	T	PCT.	GF	GA	GP	W	L	T	GF	GA
Army	3	1	2	0	.333	2	6	9	3	6	0	15	27
Carnegie Tech	2	1	1	0	.500	1	2	–	–	–	–	–	–
Columbia	4	0	4	0	.000	4	17	5	0	5	0	4	28
Cornell	2	2	0	0	1.000	11	0	2	2	0	0	11	0
Dartmouth	5	3	2	0	.600	15	20	7	5	2	0	30	25
Harvard	6	5	1	0	.833	49	11	10	8	2	0	66	21
MIT	4	1	3	0	.250	4	17	7	3	4	0	19	26
Princeton	4	4	0	0	1.000	14	6	8	5	3	0	20	25
Rensselaer	3	2	1	0	.667	4	2	3	2	1	0	4	2
Rochester	–	–	–	–	–	–	–	–	–	–	–	–	–
Springfield Training	–	–	–	–	–	–	–	–	–	–	–	–	–
Trinity	–	–	–	–	–	–	–	–	–	–	–	–	–
Union	–	–	–	–	–	–	–	1	1	0	0	–	–
Western University of Pennsylvania	2	0	2	0	.000	0	3	2	0	2	0	0	3
Williams	2	0	2	0	.000	3	5	5	1	4	0	12	17
Yale	6	3	3	0	.500	13	12	9	3	6	0	15	20

== Schedule and results ==
Date	Opponent	Site	Result	Record
Regular Season
December 27	Newton High School*	Brae Burn Rink • West Newton, Massachusetts	W 4–0	1–0–0
December 29	Dartmouth*	Boston, Massachusetts	L 2–3	1–1–0
January 10	at Harvard*	Brae Burn Rink • West Newton, Massachusetts	L 0–8	1–2–0
January 26	Brae Burn Country Club*		L 2–8	1–3–0
January 28	Stone's School*		W 9–1	2–3–0
January 30	at Williams*	Cole Field House Pond • Williamstown, Massachusetts	W 2–1	3–3–0
January 31	Springfield Training*		L 0–5	3–4–0
*Non-conference game.
