= 1906–07 Carnegie Tech Tartans men's ice hockey season =

- Home ice: Duquesne Garden

Record
- Overall: 1–1–0 ?

Coaches and captains
- Captain: John Charles

The 1906–07 Carnegie Tech Tartans men's ice hockey season was the 2nd season of play for the program.

== Season ==
The team played three games during the season, two against fellow colleges. Carnegie Tech did not record the scores or results of their games, those statistics come from their opponents' records.

== Roster ==
No.	Nat.	Player	Class	Pos	Height	Weight	DoB	Hometown	Previous team
		Walter Adams	Sophomore	D
		John Charles (C)	Sophomore	R
		Walter Close	Sophomore	LW
		Harry Donehoo	Sophomore	G
		Eugene Dowling	Sophomore	D
		Walter Hammer	Sophomore	LW
		Howard Mason	Sophomore	RW
	(United States)	Charles McCandless II	Sophomore	RW			1887-12-10	Prospect, Pennsylvania
	(United States)	Charles Resifar	Sophomore	C			1887-06-16	Pennsylvania

== Standings ==
1906–07 Collegiate ice hockey standings
	Intercollegiate							Overall					
	GP	W	L	T	PCT.	GF	GA	GP	W	L	T	GF	GA
Army	3	1	2	0	.333	2	6	9	3	6	0	15	27
Carnegie Tech	2	1	1	0	.500	1	2	–	–	–	–	–	–
Columbia	4	0	4	0	.000	4	17	5	0	5	0	4	28
Cornell	2	2	0	0	1.000	11	0	2	2	0	0	11	0
Dartmouth	5	3	2	0	.600	15	20	7	5	2	0	30	25
Harvard	6	5	1	0	.833	49	11	10	8	2	0	66	21
MIT	4	1	3	0	.250	4	17	7	3	4	0	19	26
Princeton	4	4	0	0	1.000	14	6	8	5	3	0	20	25
Rensselaer	3	2	1	0	.667	4	2	3	2	1	0	4	2
Rochester	–	–	–	–	–	–	–	–	–	–	–	–	–
Springfield Training	–	–	–	–	–	–	–	–	–	–	–	–	–
Trinity	–	–	–	–	–	–	–	–	–	–	–	–	–
Union	–	–	–	–	–	–	–	1	1	0	0	–	–
Western University of Pennsylvania	2	0	2	0	.000	0	3	2	0	2	0	0	3
Williams	2	0	2	0	.000	3	5	5	1	4	0	12	17
Yale	6	3	3	0	.500	13	12	9	3	6	0	15	20

== Schedule and results ==
Date	Opponent	Site	Result	Record
Regular Season
December 29	Rensselaer	Duquesne Garden • Pittsburgh, Pennsylvania	W 1–0	1–0–0
January 5	Yale	Duquesne Garden • Pittsburgh, Pennsylvania	L 0–2	1–1–0
January 18	vs. Pittsburgh All-Scholastic Team	Duquesne Garden • Pittsburgh, Pennsylvania	?	
*Non-conference game.
