= 1906–07 Western University of Pennsylvania men's ice hockey season =

Hockey scores for men's WUoP in 1906-07

- Home ice: Duquesne Garden

Record
- Overall: 0–2–0
- Conference: 0–2–0
- Home: 0–2–0

Coaches and captains
- Captain: Joseph Ferner

The 1906–07 Western University of Pennsylvania men's ice hockey season was the 4th season of play for the program.

== Season ==
The team did not have a coach, however, David Johns served as team manager.

== Roster ==
No.	Nat.	Player	Class	Pos	Height	Weight	DoB	Hometown	Previous team
		Askin		C
		Alvin E. Bulger	Sophomore	G
	(United States)	Joseph J. Ferner (C)	Sophomore	D			1883-05-19	Quemahoning, Pennsylvania
		Walter G. Hayden	Freshman	LW
		David R. Johns	Sophomore	RW
		William F. Mueller	Sophomore	D

== Standings ==
1906–07 Collegiate ice hockey standings
	Intercollegiate							Overall					
	GP	W	L	T	PCT.	GF	GA	GP	W	L	T	GF	GA
Army	3	1	2	0	.333	2	6	9	3	6	0	15	27
Carnegie Tech	2	1	1	0	.500	1	2	–	–	–	–	–	–
Columbia	4	0	4	0	.000	4	17	5	0	5	0	4	28
Cornell	2	2	0	0	1.000	11	0	2	2	0	0	11	0
Dartmouth	5	3	2	0	.600	15	20	7	5	2	0	30	25
Harvard	6	5	1	0	.833	49	11	10	8	2	0	66	21
MIT	4	1	3	0	.250	4	17	7	3	4	0	19	26
Princeton	4	4	0	0	1.000	14	6	8	5	3	0	20	25
Rensselaer	3	2	1	0	.667	4	2	3	2	1	0	4	2
Rochester	–	–	–	–	–	–	–	–	–	–	–	–	–
Springfield Training	–	–	–	–	–	–	–	–	–	–	–	–	–
Trinity	–	–	–	–	–	–	–	–	–	–	–	–	–
Union	–	–	–	–	–	–	–	1	1	0	0	–	–
Western University of Pennsylvania	2	0	2	0	.000	0	3	2	0	2	0	0	3
Williams	2	0	2	0	.000	3	5	5	1	4	0	12	17
Yale	6	3	3	0	.500	13	12	9	3	6	0	15	20

== Schedule and results ==
Date	Opponent	Site	Result	Record
Regular Season
December 28	Rensselaer	Duquesne Garden • Pittsburgh, Pennsylvania	L 0–1 †	0–1–0 (0–1–0)
January 3	Yale	Duquesne Garden • Pittsburgh, Pennsylvania	L 0–2	0–2–0 (0–2–0)
*Non-conference game.

† Rensselaer records the score of the game as 2–0.
