= 1906–07 United States collegiate men's ice hockey season =

- Duration: December 1906– February 1907
- Collegiate champion: Princeton

The 1906–07 United States collegiate men's ice hockey season was the 13th season of collegiate ice hockey.

After a few years away Cornell, Rensselaer and Western University of Pennsylvania restarted their programs.

== Regular season ==
=== Standings ===
1906–07 Collegiate ice hockey standings
	Intercollegiate							Overall					
	GP	W	L	T	PCT.	GF	GA	GP	W	L	T	GF	GA
Army	3	1	2	0	.333	2	6	9	3	6	0	15	27
Carnegie Tech	2	1	1	0	.500	1	2	–	–	–	–	–	–
Columbia	4	0	4	0	.000	4	17	5	0	5	0	4	28
Cornell	2	2	0	0	1.000	11	0	2	2	0	0	11	0
Dartmouth	5	3	2	0	.600	15	20	7	5	2	0	30	25
Harvard	6	5	1	0	.833	49	11	10	8	2	0	66	21
MIT	4	1	3	0	.250	4	17	7	3	4	0	19	26
Princeton	4	4	0	0	1.000	14	6	8	5	3	0	20	25
Rensselaer	3	2	1	0	.667	4	2	3	2	1	0	4	2
Rochester	–	–	–	–	–	–	–	–	–	–	–	–	–
Springfield Training	–	–	–	–	–	–	–	–	–	–	–	–	–
Trinity	–	–	–	–	–	–	–	–	–	–	–	–	–
Union	–	–	–	–	–	–	–	1	1	0	0	–	–
Western University of Pennsylvania	2	0	2	0	.000	0	3	2	0	2	0	0	3
Williams	2	0	2	0	.000	3	5	5	1	4	0	12	17
Yale	6	3	3	0	.500	13	12	9	3	6	0	15	20

1906–07 Intercollegiate Hockey Association standings
	Conference							Overall					
	GP	W	L	T	PTS	GF	GA	GP	W	L	T	GF	GA
Princeton *	4	4	0	0	8	14	6	8	5	3	0	20	25
Harvard	4	3	1	0	6	25	9	10	8	2	0	66	21
Dartmouth	4	2	2	0	4	12	18	7	5	2	0	30	25
Yale	4	1	3	0	2	9	12	9	3	6	0	15	20
Columbia	4	0	4	0	0	4	17	5	0	5	0	4	28
* indicates conference champion
