= 1906–07 Williams Ephs men's ice hockey season =

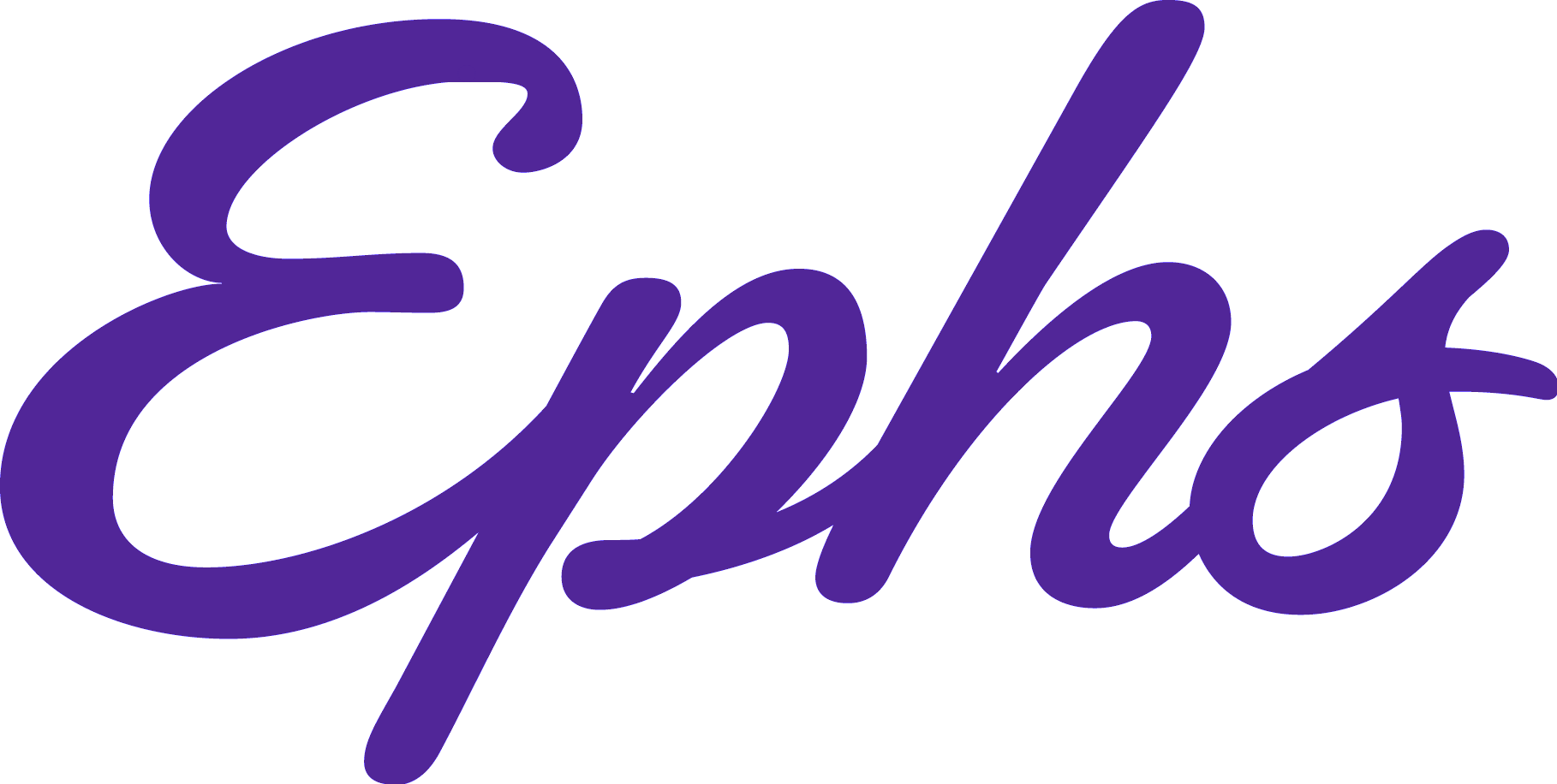
- Home ice: Cole Field House Pond

Record
- Overall: 1–4–0
- Road: 1–2–0
- Neutral: 0–2–0

Coaches and captains

The 1906–07 Williams Ephs men's ice hockey season was the 4th season of play for the program.

== Standings ==
1906–07 Collegiate ice hockey standings
	Intercollegiate							Overall					
	GP	W	L	T	PCT.	GF	GA	GP	W	L	T	GF	GA
Army	3	1	2	0	.333	2	6	9	3	6	0	15	27
Carnegie Tech	2	1	1	0	.500	1	2	–	–	–	–	–	–
Columbia	4	0	4	0	.000	4	17	5	0	5	0	4	28
Cornell	2	2	0	0	1.000	11	0	2	2	0	0	11	0
Dartmouth	5	3	2	0	.600	15	20	7	5	2	0	30	25
Harvard	6	5	1	0	.833	49	11	10	8	2	0	66	21
MIT	4	1	3	0	.250	4	17	7	3	4	0	19	26
Princeton	4	4	0	0	1.000	14	6	8	5	3	0	20	25
Rensselaer	3	2	1	0	.667	4	2	3	2	1	0	4	2
Rochester	–	–	–	–	–	–	–	–	–	–	–	–	–
Springfield Training	–	–	–	–	–	–	–	–	–	–	–	–	–
Trinity	–	–	–	–	–	–	–	–	–	–	–	–	–
Union	–	–	–	–	–	–	–	1	1	0	0	–	–
Western University of Pennsylvania	2	0	2	0	.000	0	3	2	0	2	0	0	3
Williams	2	0	2	0	.000	3	5	5	1	4	0	12	17
Yale	6	3	3	0	.500	13	12	9	3	6	0	15	20

== Schedule and results ==
Date	Opponent	Site	Result	Record
Regular Season
January 12	at Hoosac School*	Hoosick, New York	W 6–2	1–0–0
January 19	vs. Springfield Training*	Empire Rink • Albany, New York	L 2–3	1–1–0
January 30	MIT*	Cole Field House Pond • Williamstown, Massachusetts	L 1–2	1–2–0
February 8	at Louden Field Club*	Empire Rink • Albany, New York	L 1–4	1–3–0
February 9	at Louden Field Club*	Empire Rink • Albany, New York	L 2–6	1–4–0
*Non-conference game.
