= 1906–07 Cornell Big Red men's ice hockey season =

- Home ice: Beebe Lake

Record
- Overall: 2–0–0
- Home: 1–0–0
- Road: 1–0–0

Coaches and captains
- Captain: Ralph Lally

The 1906–07 Cornell Big Red men's ice hockey season was the 6th season of play for the program.

== Season ==
After lying fallow for two years, the men's team returned to the ice. The Big Red played their first official home games this season at a rink constructed on Beebe Lake. While the season was short, the fact that the icers had resurfaced was enough to provide some optimism for the program.

== Roster ==
No.	Nat.	Player	Class	Pos	Height	Weight	DoB	Hometown	Previous team
		George Adler		G			1886-02-14
		Lewis Gates		D
		Edward Greer		LW			1885-08-01
	(United States)	Ralph Lally (C)		R			1885-06-17	Pittsburgh, Pennsylvania
		Harry Reiber		RW
		William Riketson		D
	(United States)	Curtis Yohe		C			1887-09-22	Connellsville, Pennsylvania

== Standings ==
1906–07 Collegiate ice hockey standings
	Intercollegiate							Overall					
	GP	W	L	T	PCT.	GF	GA	GP	W	L	T	GF	GA
Army	3	1	2	0	.333	2	6	9	3	6	0	15	27
Carnegie Tech	2	1	1	0	.500	1	2	–	–	–	–	–	–
Columbia	4	0	4	0	.000	4	17	5	0	5	0	4	28
Cornell	2	2	0	0	1.000	11	0	2	2	0	0	11	0
Dartmouth	5	3	2	0	.600	15	20	7	5	2	0	30	25
Harvard	6	5	1	0	.833	49	11	10	8	2	0	66	21
MIT	4	1	3	0	.250	4	17	7	3	4	0	19	26
Princeton	4	4	0	0	1.000	14	6	8	5	3	0	20	25
Rensselaer	3	2	1	0	.667	4	2	3	2	1	0	4	2
Rochester	–	–	–	–	–	–	–	–	–	–	–	–	–
Springfield Training	–	–	–	–	–	–	–	–	–	–	–	–	–
Trinity	–	–	–	–	–	–	–	–	–	–	–	–	–
Union	–	–	–	–	–	–	–	1	1	0	0	–	–
Western University of Pennsylvania	2	0	2	0	.000	0	3	2	0	2	0	0	3
Williams	2	0	2	0	.000	3	5	5	1	4	0	12	17
Yale	6	3	3	0	.500	13	12	9	3	6	0	15	20

== Schedule and results ==
Date	Opponent	Site	Result	Record
Regular season
February 9	Rochester	Beebe Lake • Ithaca, New York	W 7–0	1–0–0
February 16	at Army	Lusk Reservoir • West Point, New York	W 4–0	2–0–0
*Non-conference game.

== Scoring statistics ==
Name	Position	Games	Goals
Ralph Lally	R	2	4
Curtis Yohe	C	2	4
Harry Reiber	RW	2	2
Edward Greer	LW	2	1
Lewis Gates	D	2	0
William Ricketson	D	2	0
George Adler	G	2	0
Total			11

Note: Assists were not recorded as a statistic.
