= 1906–07 Harvard Crimson men's ice hockey season =

College ice hockey season

- Conference: 2nd IHA
- Home ice: Harvard Stadium Rink

Record
- Overall: 8–2–0
- Conference: 3–1–0
- Home: 3–1–0
- Road: 3–0–0
- Neutral: 2–1–0

Coaches and captains
- Head coach: Alfred Winsor
- Captain: Richard Townsend

The 1906–07 Harvard Crimson men's ice hockey season was the tenth season of play for the program.

== Season ==
Harvard's unbeaten streak was finally ended in 1907. The Crimson ice hockey team lost twice during the season, suffering their first defeat since March 15, 1902. The loss to Princeton also ended Harvard's four-year reign as Intercollegiate Hockey Association champion as the Tigers were able to finish undefeated in league play.

== Roster ==
No.	Nat.	Player	Class	Pos	Height	Weight	DoB	Hometown	Previous team
	(United States)	Templeton Briggs	Sophomore	F			1887-02-09	Chestnut Hill, Massachusetts
		Kenneth Carpenter	Junior	G
		Cutler		F
		Stephen Edgell	Senior	F
	(United States)	Hatherly Foster	Senior	D			1885-07-14	Brookline, Massachusetts
	(United States)	Charles Leonard	Junior	F				West Newton, Massachusetts
	(United States)	Morton Newhall	Junior	F			1886-09-15	Germantown, Pennsylvania
		John Paine	Sophomore	F
	(United States)	Clarence Pell	Junior	F			1885-07-29	Newport, Rhode Island
	(United States)	Laurence Rumsey Jr.	Junior	F			1885-09-02	Buffalo, New York
	(United States)	Thompson Sampson	Sophomore	D			1886-04-23	Boston, Massachusetts
	(United States)	Richard Townsend (C)	Senior	F			1885-07-27	Roxbury, Massachusetts
	(United States)	Frank Washburn	Sophomore	G			1887-12-04	New York, New York

== Standings ==
1906–07 Collegiate ice hockey standings
	Intercollegiate							Overall					
	GP	W	L	T	PCT.	GF	GA	GP	W	L	T	GF	GA
Army	3	1	2	0	.333	2	6	9	3	6	0	15	27
Carnegie Tech	2	1	1	0	.500	1	2	–	–	–	–	–	–
Columbia	4	0	4	0	.000	4	17	5	0	5	0	4	28
Cornell	2	2	0	0	1.000	11	0	2	2	0	0	11	0
Dartmouth	5	3	2	0	.600	15	20	7	5	2	0	30	25
Harvard	6	5	1	0	.833	49	11	10	8	2	0	66	21
MIT	4	1	3	0	.250	4	17	7	3	4	0	19	26
Princeton	4	4	0	0	1.000	14	6	8	5	3	0	20	25
Rensselaer	3	2	1	0	.667	4	2	3	2	1	0	4	2
Rochester	–	–	–	–	–	–	–	–	–	–	–	–	–
Springfield Training	–	–	–	–	–	–	–	–	–	–	–	–	–
Trinity	–	–	–	–	–	–	–	–	–	–	–	–	–
Union	–	–	–	–	–	–	–	1	1	0	0	–	–
Western University of Pennsylvania	2	0	2	0	.000	0	3	2	0	2	0	0	3
Williams	2	0	2	0	.000	3	5	5	1	4	0	12	17
Yale	6	3	3	0	.500	13	12	9	3	6	0	15	20

1906–07 Intercollegiate Hockey Association standings
	Conference							Overall					
	GP	W	L	T	PTS	GF	GA	GP	W	L	T	GF	GA
Princeton *	4	4	0	0	8	14	6	8	5	3	0	20	25
Harvard	4	3	1	0	6	25	9	10	8	2	0	66	21
Dartmouth	4	2	2	0	4	12	18	7	5	2	0	30	25
Yale	4	1	3	0	2	9	12	9	3	6	0	15	20
Columbia	4	0	4	0	0	4	17	5	0	5	0	4	28
* indicates conference champion

== Schedule and results ==
Date	Opponent	Site	Result	Record
Regular Season
January 5	at Brae Burn Country Club*	Brae Burn Rink • West Newton, Massachusetts	W 3–0	1–0–0
January 10	vs. MIT*	Brae Burn Rink • West Newton, Massachusetts	W 8–0	2–0–0
January 12	at Columbia	St. Nicholas Rink • New York, New York	W 7–0	3–0–0 (1–0–0)
January 16	Springfield Training*	Harvard Stadium Rink • Cambridge, Massachusetts	W 16–1	4–0–0
January 19	vs. Princeton	St. Nicholas Rink • New York, New York	L 3–4	4–1–0 (1–1–0)
January 23	Phillips Academy*	Harvard Stadium Rink • Cambridge, Massachusetts	W 7–2	5–1–0
February 7	Dartmouth	Harvard Stadium Rink • Cambridge, Massachusetts	W 12–3	6–1–0 (2–1–0)
February 9	McGill*	Harvard Stadium Rink • Cambridge, Massachusetts	L 2–8	6–2–0
February 12	at St. Paul's School*	Concord, New Hampshire	W 5–1	7–2–0
February 16	vs. Yale	St. Nicholas Rink • New York, New York (Rivalry)	W 3–2	8–2–0 (3–1–0)
*Non-conference game.

== Scoring Statistics ==
Name	Position	Games	Goals
Clarence Pell	F	10	18
Richard Townsend	F	10	16
Laurence Rumsey	F	10	13
Morton Newhall	F	10	12
Charles Leonard	F	9	3
John Paine	F	3	2
Joseph Willetts	D	8	1
Hatherly Foster	F/D	10	1
Cutler	F	1	0
Arnold Fraser-Campbell	F/D	3	0
Stephen Edgell	F	3	0
Frank Washburn	G	5	0
Carpenter	G	6	0
Thompson Sampson	D	7	0
Templeton Briggs	D	8	0
Total			66

Note: Assists were not recorded as a statistic.
