= 1937–38 Cornell Big Red men's ice hockey season =

Intercollegiate hockey season

- Home ice: Beebe Lake

Record
- Overall: 0–4–0
- Home: 0–1–0
- Road: 0–3–0

Coaches and captains
- Head coach: Nick Bawlf

The 1937–38 Cornell Big Red men's ice hockey season was the 31st season of play for the program. The teams was coached by Nick Bawlf in his 16th season.

== Season ==
Cornell commenced its season on January 4 while the ice was still too thin for the temporary boards to be set up. The team scheduled its first game in mid-January so it would have a couple of weeks to practice together ahead of the match, a luxury the Big Red rarely possessed in recent years. The first game of the season, a contest against Columbia, was cancelled at the last minute, leaving Cornell with two games prior to the semester break. The opening game came against Colgate and the Maroons got the better of the Big Red once again. The team had to fix its problems quickly as the second game was just three days away. Unfortunately, Cornell was hopelessly outmatched by Clarkson and embarrassed to the tune of 0–10.

Cornell had to live with that loss for a full month before their next game. A rematch with Clarkson that was to be played on the 10th was cancelled due to weather. The temperature got so bad that even the rematch with Colgate had to be scrapped. Cornell ended up having to finish its season on the road and the lack of available ice for practice proved disastrous. The Big Red lost a pair of 1-goal games and ended the year without a loss, producing their worst season in 25 years.

== Roster ==
No.	Nat.	Player	Class	Pos	Height	Weight	DoB	Hometown	Previous team
	(United States)	Jack Babson		RW				Yonkers, New York
	(United States)	Albert Bosson	Junior	G				Cambridge, Massachusetts
	(United States)	Ernest Dahman	Senior	D			1915-10-02	Ithaca, New York
	(United States)	Oliver Gildersleeve		F			1917-01-22	Portland, Connecticut
	(United States)	Glen Guthrie	Senior	C				Ithaca, New York
	(United States)	Hays		LW				Ithaca, New York
	(United States)	Ray McElwee	Sophomore	D				Ithaca, New York
	(United States)	Robert Wiggans		D			1918-04-17	Ithaca, New York

== Standings ==
1937–38 Eastern Collegiate ice hockey standings
	Intercollegiate							Overall					
	GP	W	L	T	Pct.	GF	GA	GP	W	L	T	GF	GA
Army	–	–	–	–	–	–	–	10	5	4	1	29	21
Boston College	–	–	–	–	–	–	–	15	9	6	0	75	56
Boston University	15	9	4	2	.667	88	61	15	9	4	2	88	61
Bowdoin	–	–	–	–	–	–	–	12	6	6	0	–	–
Brown	–	–	–	–	–	–	–	14	5	9	0	–	–
Clarkson	–	–	–	–	–	–	–	15	13	1	1	105	34
Colgate	–	–	–	–	–	–	–	7	3	4	0	–	–
Columbia	2	0	2	0	.000	1	9	11	2	8	1	17	42
Cornell	4	0	4	0	.000	4	17	4	0	4	0	4	17
Dartmouth	–	–	–	–	–	–	–	22	18	4	0	105	78
Hamilton	–	–	–	–	–	–	–	9	5	4	0	–	–
Harvard	–	–	–	–	–	–	–	14	6	7	1	–	–
Lafayette	1	0	1	0	.000	0	5	2	1	1	0	5	7
Massachusetts State	–	–	–	–	–	–	–	7	2	4	1	–	–
Middlebury	–	–	–	–	–	–	–	11	2	7	2	–	–
MIT	–	–	–	–	–	–	–	12	6	6	0	–	–
New Hampshire	–	–	–	–	–	–	–	10	6	3	1	69	41
Northeastern	–	–	–	–	–	–	–	13	3	9	1	–	–
Princeton	–	–	–	–	–	–	–	18	5	12	1	–	–
Rensselaer	–	–	–	–	–	–	–	3	0	3	0	–	–
Union	–	–	–	–	–	–	–	4	0	3	1	–	–
Williams	–	–	–	–	–	–	–	14	10	3	1	–	–
Yale	–	–	–	–	–	–	–	18	7	10	1	–	–

== Schedule and results ==
Date	Opponent	Site	Result	Record
Regular season
January 19	Colgate*	Beebe Lake • Ithaca, New York	L 1–2	0–1–0
January 22	at Clarkson*	Ives Park • Potsdam, New York	L 0–10	0–2–0
February 22	at Hamilton*	Russell Sage Rink • Clinton, New York	L 2–3 ^{OT}	0–3–0
February 26	at Army*	Smith Rink • West Point, New York	L 1–2	0–4–0
*Non-conference game.
