= 1906–07 Dartmouth men's ice hockey season =

- Conference: 3rd IHA
- Home ice: Occom Pond

Record
- Overall: 5–2–0
- Conference: 3–2–0
- Home: 1–0–0
- Road: 3–1–0
- Neutral: 1–1–0

Coaches and captains
- Captain(s): Eugene Brooks; John Crocker; Warren Foote

The 1906–07 Dartmouth men's ice hockey season was the 2nd season of play for the program.

== Season ==
After a brief debut in 1906, Dartmouth's ice hockey team played a fuller schedule in their second campaign. The Greens played most of their games on the road but that didn't stop them from posting their first winning record.

Note: Dartmouth College did not possess a moniker for its athletic teams until the 1920s, however, the university had adopted 'Dartmouth Green' as its school color in 1866.

== Roster ==
No.	Nat.	Player	Class	Pos	Height	Weight	DoB	Hometown	Previous team
	(United States)	Chester S. Brett	Sophomore	F/D				Massachusetts
	(United States)	Eugene C. Brooks (C)	Senior	F			1887-03-11	Cambridge, Massachusetts
	(United States)	John F. Crocker (C)	Senior	D				Cambridge, Massachusetts
		Arthur F. Doe	Sophomore	F
		Emile H. Erhard	Sophomore	G
	(United States)	Warren C. Foote (C)	Junior	F				Newton Center, Massachusetts
	(United States)	Stanley W. Leighton	Sophomore	D				Boston, Massachusetts
		Joseph L. Richardson	Junior	F
		Lauris G. Treadway	Junior	F			1884-05-13

== Standings ==
1906–07 Collegiate ice hockey standings
	Intercollegiate							Overall					
	GP	W	L	T	PCT.	GF	GA	GP	W	L	T	GF	GA
Army	3	1	2	0	.333	2	6	9	3	6	0	15	27
Carnegie Tech	2	1	1	0	.500	1	2	–	–	–	–	–	–
Columbia	4	0	4	0	.000	4	17	5	0	5	0	4	28
Cornell	2	2	0	0	1.000	11	0	2	2	0	0	11	0
Dartmouth	5	3	2	0	.600	15	20	7	5	2	0	30	25
Harvard	6	5	1	0	.833	49	11	10	8	2	0	66	21
MIT	4	1	3	0	.250	4	17	7	3	4	0	19	26
Princeton	4	4	0	0	1.000	14	6	8	5	3	0	20	25
Rensselaer	3	2	1	0	.667	4	2	3	2	1	0	4	2
Rochester	–	–	–	–	–	–	–	–	–	–	–	–	–
Springfield Training	–	–	–	–	–	–	–	–	–	–	–	–	–
Trinity	–	–	–	–	–	–	–	–	–	–	–	–	–
Union	–	–	–	–	–	–	–	1	1	0	0	–	–
Western University of Pennsylvania	2	0	2	0	.000	0	3	2	0	2	0	0	3
Williams	2	0	2	0	.000	3	5	5	1	4	0	12	17
Yale	6	3	3	0	.500	13	12	9	3	6	0	15	20

1906–07 Intercollegiate Hockey Association standings
	Conference							Overall					
	GP	W	L	T	PTS	GF	GA	GP	W	L	T	GF	GA
Princeton *	4	4	0	0	8	14	6	8	5	3	0	20	25
Harvard	4	3	1	0	6	25	9	10	8	2	0	66	21
Dartmouth	4	2	2	0	4	12	18	7	5	2	0	30	25
Yale	4	1	3	0	2	9	12	9	3	6	0	15	20
Columbia	4	0	4	0	0	4	17	5	0	5	0	4	28
* indicates conference champion

== Schedule and results ==
Date	Opponent	Site	Result	Record
Regular Season
December 26	at Rindge High School*	Rindge, New Hampshire	W 6–0	1–0–0
December 29	at MIT*	Tech Rink • Boston, Massachusetts	W 3–2	2–0–0 (1–0–0)
January 9	vs. Princeton	St. Nicholas Rink • New York, New York	L 2–3	2–1–0 (1–1–0)
January 11	vs. Coaticook Club*	Durham, New Hampshire	W 9–5	3–1–0
January 16	vs. Yale	St. Nicholas Rink • New York, New York	W 4–2	4–1–0 (2–1–0)
January 18	at Columbia	St. Nicholas Rink • New York, New York	W 3–1	5–1–0 (3–1–0)
February 7	at Harvard	Harvard Stadium Rink • Boston, Massachusetts	L 3–12	5–2–0 (3–2–0)
*Non-conference game.
