= 1906–07 Army Cadets men's ice hockey season =

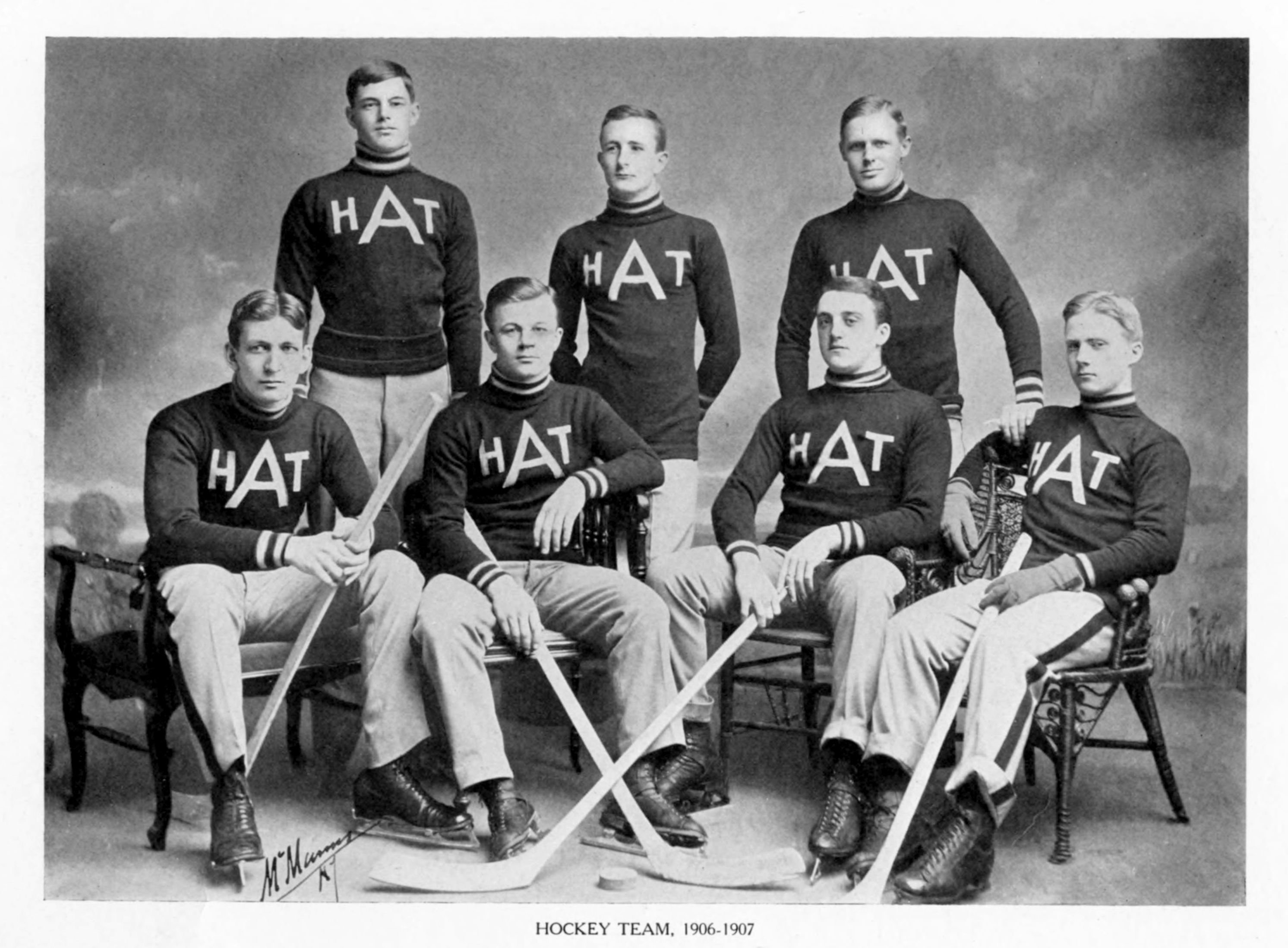
- Conference: Independent
- Home ice: Lusk Reservoir

Record
- Overall: 3–6–0

Coaches and captains
- Head coach: Robert Foy
- Captain: Richard Park

The 1906–07 Army Cadets men's ice hockey season was the 4th season of play for the program.

== Season ==
Army's third season in ice hockey brought about its first losing record. The Cadets played so poorly at the end of the year that they were shutout by two secondary schools.

== Roster ==
No.	Nat.	Player	Class	Pos	Height	Weight	DoB	Hometown	Previous team
	(United States)	Geoffrey Bartlett	Senior	R				Massachusetts
	(United States)	Philip Hayes	Sophomore	RW			1887-06-16	Portage, Wisconsin
	(United States)	Philip Gordon	Junior	LW				New York
	(United States)	Richard Park (C)	Senior	D			1883-11-20	Malden, Massachusetts
	(United States)	Robert Parker	Sophomore	C				Massachusetts
		Rogers		D
	(United States)	Edwin Sumner	Junior	G				New York

== Standings ==
1906–07 Collegiate ice hockey standings
	Intercollegiate							Overall					
	GP	W	L	T	PCT.	GF	GA	GP	W	L	T	GF	GA
Army	3	1	2	0	.333	2	6	9	3	6	0	15	27
Carnegie Tech	2	1	1	0	.500	1	2	–	–	–	–	–	–
Columbia	4	0	4	0	.000	4	17	5	0	5	0	4	28
Cornell	2	2	0	0	1.000	11	0	2	2	0	0	11	0
Dartmouth	5	3	2	0	.600	15	20	7	5	2	0	30	25
Harvard	6	5	1	0	.833	49	11	10	8	2	0	66	21
MIT	4	1	3	0	.250	4	17	7	3	4	0	19	26
Princeton	4	4	0	0	1.000	14	6	8	5	3	0	20	25
Rensselaer	3	2	1	0	.667	4	2	3	2	1	0	4	2
Rochester	–	–	–	–	–	–	–	–	–	–	–	–	–
Springfield Training	–	–	–	–	–	–	–	–	–	–	–	–	–
Trinity	–	–	–	–	–	–	–	–	–	–	–	–	–
Union	–	–	–	–	–	–	–	1	1	0	0	–	–
Western University of Pennsylvania	2	0	2	0	.000	0	3	2	0	2	0	0	3
Williams	2	0	2	0	.000	3	5	5	1	4	0	12	17
Yale	6	3	3	0	.500	13	12	9	3	6	0	15	20

== Schedule and results ==
Date	Opponent	Site	Result	Record
Regular Season
	Trinity*	Lusk Reservoir • West Point, New York	W 1–0	1–0–0
	Riverview Military Academy*	Lusk Reservoir • West Point, New York	L 0–3	1–1–0
	Newburgh Free Academy*	Lusk Reservoir • West Point, New York	W 6–0	2–1–0
	Louden Field Club*	Lusk Reservoir • West Point, New York	L 0–3	2–2–0
February 9	Rensselaer*	Lusk Reservoir • West Point, New York	L 1–2	2–3–0
	Cutler School*	Lusk Reservoir • West Point, New York	W 7–1	3–3–0
February 16	Cornell*	Lusk Reservoir • West Point, New York	L 0–4	3–4–0
	St. Paul's School*	Lusk Reservoir • West Point, New York	L 0–2	3–5–0
	Albany High School*	Lusk Reservoir • West Point, New York	L 0–12	3–6–0
*Non-conference game.
