= New Haven Eagles (EHL) =

- City: New Haven, Connecticut
- League: Eastern Amateur Hockey League
- Operated: 1943–1944
- Home arena: New Haven Arena

The New Haven Eagles were a minor professional ice hockey team based in New Haven, Connecticut. The team played at the New Haven Arena played just 12 games during World War II.

== History ==
The New Haven Eagles were a minor professional team that began play when the New Haven Arena was rebuilt in 1926. The team played continually until 1943 when they suspended play for the duration of World War II. In their absence, the Eastern Amateur Hockey League stepped in and founded a new team to take up residency at the Arena. Hoping to cash in on name recognition, the new team used the same name as the original franchise but otherwise had no connection to the AHL team. The team brought former Eagle player Normand Shay out of retirement to coach the club but, unfortunately, they had no on-ice success. The Eagles won just once in their first 12 games and then withdrew from the league in the middle of the season.

== Season-by-season record ==
Note: GP = Games played, W = Wins, L = Losses, T = Ties, Pts = Points, GF = Goals for, GA = Goals against

Season	GP	W	L	T	Pts	GF	GA	Finish	Coach	Playoffs
1943–44	12	1	11	0	2	35	76	withdrew	Normand Shay	—
