= Brooklyn Ice Palace =

Indoor Ice Rink

- Interactive map of Brooklyn Ice Palace
- Location: 1163 Atlantic Avenue; Brooklyn, New York, 11216
- Coordinates: 40°40′44″N 73°57′09″W
- Surface: 17,000 ft.^{2}

Construction
- Opened: January 15, 1917
- Closed: April 15, 1956

Tenants
- Brooklyn Crescents (1917–1918); Columbia Lions men's ice hockey (1937–1938); Brooklyn Americans (1941–1942); Brooklyn Crescents (1943–1944)

The Brooklyn Ice Palace in Brooklyn, New York was an indoor ice rink. The venue was used for multiple events over the years but it primarily functioned as a home for figure skating and ice hockey.

== History ==
The rink was one of the world's largest when it opened to great fanfare in January 1917. With the United States entering World War I just months later, the ice palace became significantly less important. In March of the following year, the state ice controller ordered the place shut in order to save ammonia and other ice making equipment.

After the war the Ice Palace was converted into a 2,500-seat movie theater with space for a pipe organ and a symphony orchestra. It was one of the first known theaters with a cooling system. The venture wasn't profitable and soon fell into bankruptcy. The theater was reopened in 1921 and operated until 1937 when the interior of the facility was remodeled back into an ice rink including an eatery called The Skaters Inn.

The new facility opened just in time for Columbia University to bring its varsity ice hockey team back and the Lions played seven games during that season. While the team planned to return the following year, nothing materialized on the Columbia campus.

In 1941, after the New York Americans moved to Brooklyn, the Ice Palace became the team's practice facility. Due to World War II, the Americans lost players until just 4 remained before suspending operations the following year. While there were plans to bring the team back after the war, the NHL eventually decided to not allow them to join. A few years after the demise of the Amerks, a second professional team moved to Brooklyn. The Brooklyn Crescents used the same name as a tenant in the Ice Palace's first year of operation but had no other connection to that original team. The team was largely unsuccessful, winning 5 out of 45 games during the year and finishing last in the EAHL standings. They also lasted just one year at the ice palace.

During the series of unsuccessful ice hockey teams, the rink found new life as the center for New York figure skating & amateur speed skating. Several skaters who later earned notoriety on the world & national stage began their careers at the ice palace such as Dick Button, Carol Heiss-Jenkins and Sonya Klopfer. Button was a two time Olympic champion and five time world champion. Heiss was a silver medalist at the 1956 Olympics. Klopfer was a future medalist at the World Championships and a competitor at the 1952 Winter Olympics.

The Ice Palace was remodeled twice after refurbishing the rink but still wasn't able to keep pace with newer facilities that were opening in the city, such as the Wollman Rink in Central Park. It was closed on April 15, 1956 and converted into a scenery design shop. In the end the building was razed and a parking lot now sits on the site (as of 2021).
