= Pittsburgh Panthers men's ice hockey =

- University: University of Pittsburgh
- First season: 1896–97
- Head coach: Stu Rulnick
- Arena: Alpha Ice Complex; Pittsburgh, Pennsylvania
- Colors: Blue and gold

The Pittsburgh Panthers men's ice hockey team is a college ice hockey program that represents University of Pittsburgh. They are currently a member of the American Collegiate Hockey Association at the Division I level and formerly fielded a Division II club from 2001 to 2020. The university previously sponsored varsity ice hockey from off and on from 1896 to 1939.

== History ==
=== Foundation ===
In 1895, the Schenley Park Casino opened with one of the first artificial ice rinks in the United States. By the end of the year, the first recorded ice hockey match in Pittsburgh took place when the team from Queen's University took on a group of students from the Western University of Pennsylvania (Pitt) and Pittsburgh Catholic College of the Holy Ghost (Duquesne). The only account of the game comes from a report by the Pittsburgh Press and though it did not include the score, it did remark that the Canadiens vastly outplayed the locals, none of whom had played ice hockey before.

The operators of the rink, looking for additional revenue streams, took note of the 2,500 to 3,000 people who attended the game and decided to organize a local hockey league. Over the course of several months, they were able to convince enough organizations to buy in and arranged both a high school and a senior circuit. Western University allowed its students to participate in the new league and the first college team from Pennsylvania was born, beating out Penn by mere months. Unfortunately, the league was forced to suspend operations a week before Christmas when the Casino burned down.

While the loss of the rink could have spelled an end to both the league and ice hockey in Pittsburgh, the Duquesne Garden was already undergoing a renovation to become an ice hockey rink and Western University would be back on the ice in 1898. The team remained a member of the Western Pennsylvania Hockey League once it resurfaced, but the club also played its first intercollegiate games during this time. All three WPHL teams took a trip up to New Haven to take on the intercollegiate champions, Yale, at the end of February. Western got its turn on the 24th, losing their first intercollegiate match 1–3. The following season Yale returned the favor and met Western University in Pittsburgh for a rematch just after New Year's. Yale defended its honor with another win but the loss was the least of the worries for Western. Costs and time constraints on the students eventually led Western University to stop supporting the ice hockey team, despite the popularity of the sport in the region.

Though Yale continued to take annual trips to the region, as did a handful of other schools, WUP remained dormant for the next several years. It wasn't until Carnegie Tech founded its team in 1906 that the administration at Western allowed their students to return to the game. The school did not treat the game or their team seriously and barely had a mention of the club in school's yearbook in 1907. However, despite the reticence from the school, the club managed to survive and was still around when the college changed its name to the 'University of Pittsburgh' in 1908.

The program experienced a crisis in 1909 when the Western Pennsylvania Hockey League collapsed. By that time, trips from schools out east had stopped and that left Pitt with just one opponent in Carnegie Tech. The two were able to convince a group of students from Penn State to try their hand at ice hockey, partly due to the Duquesne Garden agreeing to cover travel expenses, and the three formed the 'Intercollegiate League'. However, the team from Penn State had not gotten approval from their athletic department and the new team was forced to disband after playing just two games. Pitt and Carnegie desperately searched for another college to join but they found no takers. After the season, with diminishing interest in the program and the sport, The Panthers' shuttered their ice hockey team.

=== Return ===
Pitt's program remained dormant for over 25 years and didn't return until ice hockey began to experience a resurgence at the end of the Great Depression. Several schools in the Cleveland-area banded together to form an ice hockey league, playing out of the Cleveland Arena. Wanting to expand beyond their immediate locale, the colleges were able to get three schools from Pittsburgh to join the new league. Carnegie Tech, Duquesne, and Pitt agreed to join the new circuit with all three playing out of the Duquesne Garden. Pitt was one of the better teams for the first two years, winning the eastern division in back-to-back seasons, however, the league had problems. Because upwards of eight teams shared ice at two rinks, games had to be limited to 15-minute periods with no overtime allowed. This problem, compounded with the fact that any time a member of the Penn-Ohio League played outside the conference they tended to be wiped out by a more established program, left the league as little more than a joke among college hockey circles.

Just before Pitt was scheduled to begin its third season in the league, the team abruptly withdrew and suspended operations. The other two Pittsburgh schools followed suit after the season and the entire league was gone by 1941.

=== Club hockey ===
In 1971, the program resurfaced as a club team, playing five years before disappearing. The program got back on its feet in 1983 and has remained alive ever since. The school supported teams in two divisions for 20 years but it was the Division I club that saw the most success. Since Stu Rulnick became coach in 2010, the Panthers have won 5 regular season conference titles and two league tournaments. The Panthers reached the national tournament for the first time in 2017.

== Season-by-season results ==
=== Varsity ===
NCAA D-I Champions	NCAA Frozen Four	Conference Regular Season Champions	Conference Playoff Champions

Season	Conference	Regular Season (Note: Code explanation; GP—Games Played, W—Wins, L—Losses, T—Tied games, Pts—Points)											Conference Tournament Results	National Tournament Results
Season	Conference	Conference						Overall					Conference Tournament Results	National Tournament Results
Season	Conference	GP	W	L	T	Pts*	Finish	GP	W	L	T	%	Conference Tournament Results	National Tournament Results
1896–97	WPHL	–	–	–	–	–	–	–	–	–	–	–		
Program suspended due to rink fire
1898–99	WPHL	–	–	–	–	–	–	–	–	–	–	–		
1899–00	WPHL	–	–	–	–	–	–	–	–	–	–	–		
Program suspended
1906–07	Independent	–	–	–	–	–	–	2	0	2	0	.000		
1907–08	Independent	–	–	–	–	–	–	–	–	–	–	–		
1908–09	Independent	–	–	–	–	–	–	4	1	2	1	.375		
1909–10	Intercollegiate League	4	1	2	1	.375	2nd	4	1	2	1	.375		
Program suspended
John McSorley (1937–1939)
1937–38	Penn-Ohio League	12	9	2	1	.792	3rd	17	10	6	1	.618	Won Division Final series, 3–1 (Duquesne); Lost Championship series, 1–6 (John Carroll)	
1938–39	Penn-Ohio League	18	12	4	2	.722	3rd	25	14	8	3	.620	Won Division Final series, 2–1–1 (Duquesne); Lost Championship series, 0–2 (John Carroll)	
Program suspended
Totals								GP	W	L	T	%	Championships	
Regular Season								–	–	–	–	–		
Conference Post-season								–	–	–	–	–		
NCAA Post-season								–	–	–	–	–		
Regular Season and Post-season Record								–	–	–	–	–		

Note: records of the ice hockey team before 1910 are incomplete.
