= Penn-Ohio Intercollegiate Hockey League =

Collegiate ice hockey conference

- Association: NCAA

The Pennsylvania-Ohio Intercollegiate Hockey League, sometimes called the Penn-Ohio Intercollegiate Hockey League, Ohio-Penn Intercollegiate Hockey League or Cleveland-Pittsburgh Intercollegiate Hockey League, was a varsity men's collegiate ice hockey conference from 1937 to 1941.

== History ==
The conference existed as early as 1930 as a loose affiliation of varsity and non-varsity programs.

In Pittsburgh, Duquesne University had a desire to align themselves with local schools who had a commitment to varsity intercollegiate hockey. In Cleveland, Al Supthin, owner of the Cleveland Barons was looking to fill the schedule of his newly completed Cleveland Arena. Supthin helped establish the league by offering Cleveland Arena as a home rink for local colleges. The league was officially formed in 1937 and divided into Eastern (Pittsburgh colleges) and Western (Cleveland area colleges) divisions.

The original members were Baldwin Wallace College, Carnegie Institute of Technology, Duquesne University, Fenn College, John Carroll University, University of Pittsburgh, and Western Reserve University.

Just before the 1939–1940 season, Pittsburgh abruptly discontinued their hockey program leaving just two teams in the Eastern division. The league abandoned the two-division format for 1939–1940. The other Pittsburgh colleges, Duquesne and Carnegie Tech, dropped hockey after 1940 leaving the league with only the Ohio colleges of Case, Fenn, John Carroll and Western Reserve. The four schools continued competing as a league dropping the "Penn-Ohio" name for the 1940–1941 season.

The league ceased to exist after 1941.

== Membership ==
Locations of Cleveland-area schools
( arena)
Locations of Pittsburgh-area schools
( arena)

Institution	Location	Nickname	Founded	Type	Current Primary Conference	Colors
Baldwin Wallace College	Berea, Ohio	Yellow Jackets	1845	Private	Ohio Athletic Conference	
Carnegie Institute of Technology	Pittsburgh, Pennsylvania	Tartans	1900	Private	University Athletic Association	
Case School of Applied Science	Cleveland, Ohio	Rough Riders	1880	Private	University Athletic Association	
Duquesne University	Pittsburgh, Pennsylvania	Dukes	1879	Private/Catholic	Atlantic 10	
Fenn College	Cleveland, Ohio	Foxes	1921	Public	Horizon League	
John Carroll University	University Heights, Ohio	Blue Streaks	1886	Private/Catholic	Ohio Athletic Conference	
University of Pittsburgh	Pittsburgh, Pennsylvania	Panthers	1787	Public	Atlantic Coast Conference	
Western Reserve University	Cleveland, Ohio	Red Cats	1826	Private	University Athletic Association	

Case and Western Reserve merged to form Case Western Reserve University in 1967. The state of Ohio purchased Fenn College in 1964 and the school was re-founded as Cleveland State University.

== Regular season champions ==
=== Eastern Division ===
- 1938 Duquesne University
- 1939 Duquesne University

=== Western Division ===
- 1938 John Carroll University
- 1939 John Carroll University

=== League ===
- 1940 John Carroll University
- 1941 John Carroll University

== Playoff champions ==
=== Eastern Division ===
- 1938 University of Pittsburgh (defeated Duquesne)
- 1939 University of Pittsburgh (defeated Duquesne)

=== Western Division ===
- 1938 John Carroll University (defeated Western Reserve)
- 1939 John Carroll University (defeated Western Reserve)

=== League ===
- 1938 John Carroll University (defeated Pittsburgh 2–0 in a best-of-three series)
- 1939 John Carroll University (defeated Pittsburgh 2–0 in best-of-three series)
- 1940 John Carroll University (defeated Duquesne 2–0 in best-of-three series)
- 1941 Case Institute of Technology (defeated John Carroll 2–1 in best-of-three series)

==== Playoff format ====
- 1938 A four team divisional playoff (top two teams from each division) with the semifinals being a two games, total goals format and the championship being a best-of-three format.
- 1939 The four team divisional format was retained in 1939 with the semifinals switching to a best-of-three series.
- 1940-1941 Playoff was played between the top two teams in the league in a best-of-three series format.

== Members ==
=== Eastern Division ===
- Carnegie Institute of Technology
- Duquesne University
- University of Pittsburgh (dropped hockey on November 7, 1939)

=== Western Division ===
- Baldwin Wallace College (dropped hockey after 1938–1939 season)
- Case Institute of Technology
- Fenn College
- John Carroll University
- Western Reserve College

After Baldwin Wallace College and the University of Pittsburgh dropped hockey in 1939, the two division structure was abandoned.

== John Carroll's unbeaten streak ==
John Carroll's hockey team played without recording a loss for 41 straight games. The unbeaten streak began with a 9–1 victory over Case on January 20, 1939. Case ended the streak two years later. After John Carroll defeated Case, 6–4, in game one of the conference championship, Case recorded a triple-overtime win in game two on March 21, 1941.

=== Winning streak ===
The team also recorded 29 consecutive wins during the 41-game unbeaten streak. The winning streak began just as the unbeaten streak did on January 20, 1939. John Carroll won every game played through the end of the 1939–1940 season. The last win of the streak was a 6–5 overtime win over Duquesne in game two of the conference championship. The streak ended in the 1940–1941 season opener when John Carroll tied Western Reserve, 1-1, on December 6, 1940.

==== Controversial end ====
The winning streak ended in controversy. John Carroll's game with Western Reserve was the second game of a double-header. The first game between Case and Fenn started late which delayed the start of John Carroll's game. A paid public skate was scheduled following the double-header at 9 p.m. After regulation time expired with a tied score, arena management would not permit an overtime period in favor of starting the public skate.

=== Modern record comparison ===
The 41-game overall beaten streak and 29-game overall winning streak are not in official record books. The NCAA began record-keeping for ice hockey with the 1947–1948 season.

==== Unbeaten streak comparison ====
Compared to the modern NCAA overall unbeaten streak record of 38 games, John Carroll's unbeaten streak is three games better. The NCAA record is held by Rensselaer Polytechnic Institute in Division I and St. Norbert College and University of Massachusetts Dartmouth in Division III.

==== Winning streak comparison ====
John Carroll's 29-game overall winning streak would be second-best in Division I and third-best in Division III. Rensselaer and Cornell University hold the Division I record with a 30-game winning streak. The Division III record and second-best record are held by UMass-Dartmouth (38 games) and Adrian College (36 games), respectively.

== Eddie Arsenault ==
The best player during the conference's existence was John Carroll University's Eddie Arsenault. A native of Waterville, Maine, Arsenault was known to John Carroll fans as the "Flying Frenchman." He led the conference in goals scored for three consecutive seasons and finished his three-year career with 123 total goals. Arsenault scored 38 goals in 16 games in 1937–1938, 52 goals in 23 games in 1938–1939, and 33 goals in 14 games in 1939–1940. His 123 goals were scored in games timed 15 minutes per period under Penn-Ohio league rules, unlike today's 20-minute periods.

=== Scoring streak ===
Arsenault recorded a 28-game point streak starting on January 20, 1939, when he scored seven goals in a 9–1 win over Case. On March 10, 1939, Arsenault scored five goals against Baldwin Wallace to start a 21-game goal-scoring streak. Arsenault's point and goal streaks ended with his graduation in 1940.

Of his final 28 games, Arsenault scored at least one goal in 27 games. A game against Pittsburgh on March 8, 1939, was Arsenault's lone goalless performance. Newspapers reported Arsenault played the entire game with a broken hand.

=== Record comparison ===
The NCAA does not track records for ice hockey previous to the 1947–1948 season. However, his 123 total career goals scored in 53 games averaged to 2.32 goals-per-game. Arsenault's average set a career record for college hockey, surpassing Hobey Baker's mark of 2.16 goals per game (though that was set under many different rules and should not be considered as record-breaking). His record didn't stand for long, however, as Dick Rondeau of Dartmouth scored 103 goals in just 40 games in the early 1940s (an average of 2.58). Since 1947, only two players have come close to scoring 2 goals per game in a career, Frank Chiarelli of Rensselaer scored 155 goals in 80 games (1.94 average) while Phil Latreille of Middlebury scored 250 goals in 83 games (3.01 average).
