= 1900–01 Princeton Tigers men's ice hockey season =

College ice hockey season

- Conference: 3rd IHA

Record
- Overall: 7–6–0
- Conference: 2–2–0
- Road: 5–4–0
- Neutral: 2–2–0

Coaches and captains
- Captain: Raymond D. Little

The 1900–01 Princeton Tigers men's ice hockey season was the 2nd season of play for the program.

== Season ==
Princeton played a large number of games for a team at the time, competing against fellow colleges as well as professional clubs and secondary schools.

== Roster ==
No.	Nat.	Player	Class	Pos	Height	Weight	DoB	Hometown	Previous team
		Archibald Alexander	Junior	F
		Frederick Alexander	Junior	F
		George Brokaw	Junior	D
		Charles Brower	Freshman	D
		Elliot Brown	Freshman	G
		Thomas Hardenbergh	Freshman	F
		Howard Henry	Freshman	D
		Howard Homans	Senior	D
		Halsted Little	Senior	F/D
	(United States)	Raymond D. Little (C)	Senior	D			1880-01-05	New York, New York
		David McAlpin II	Junior	F
		Stephen McClave	Sophomore	F
		Montgomery Ogden	Junior	F
		George Paull	Sophomore	G
	(United States)	Lyttleton Purnell	Freshman				1880-11-15	Baltimore, Maryland
		Schultz		F
		G. Carlton Shafer	Sophomore	F
		Roscoe Sheffield	Junior	D
		Warner		F

== Standings ==
1900–01 Collegiate ice hockey standings
	Intercollegiate							Overall					
	GP	W	L	T	PCT.	GF	GA	GP	W	L	T	GF	GA
Brown	9	4	4	1	.500	23	39	9	4	4	1	23	39
City College of New York	–	–	–	–	–	–	–	–	–	–	–	–	–
Columbia	4	1	3	0	.250	7	21	4	1	3	0	7	21
Cornell	3	3	0	0	1.000	12	4	3	3	0	0	12	4
Harvard	3	3	0	0	1.000	14	2	3	3	0	0	14	2
Haverford	–	–	–	–	–	–	–	–	–	–	–	–	–
MIT	1	0	0	1	.500	2	2	–	–	–	–	–	–
Pennsylvania	–	–	–	–	–	–	–	–	–	–	–	–	–
Princeton	7	4	3	0	.571	28	18	13	7	6	0	50	34
Swarthmore	3	1	2	0	.333	5	13	5	2	3	0	10	19
Yale	7	5	2	0	.714	39	6	13	5	7	1	50	39

1900–01 Intercollegiate Hockey Association standings
	Conference							Overall					
	GP	W	L	T	PTS	GF	GA	GP	W	L	T	GF	GA
Brown	4	4	0	0	8	18	3	9	4	4	1	23	39
Yale *	4	3	1	0	6	25	1	13	5	7	1	50	39
Princeton	4	2	2	0	4	12	12	13	7	6	0	50	34
Columbia	4	1	3	0	2	7	21	4	1	3	0	7	21
Pennsylvania	4	0	4	0	0	7	29	–	–	–	–	–	–
* indicates conference champion

== Schedule and results ==
Date	Opponent	Site	Result	Record
Regular Season
November 30	vs. Drisler School*	St. Nicholas Rink • New York, New York	W 11–0	1–0–0
December 12	at Quaker City Hockey Club*	West Park Ice Palace • Philadelphia, Pennsylvania	L 1–6	1–1–0
December 15	at New York Athletic Club*	St. Nicholas Rink • New York, New York	L 0–3	1–2–0
December 18	at Quaker City Hockey Club*	West Park Ice Palace • Philadelphia, Pennsylvania	L 0–4	1–3–0
January 5	at Lawrenceville School*	Lawrenceville, New Jersey	W 4–0	2–3–0
January 10	at St. Nicholas Hockey Club*	St. Nicholas Rink • New York, New York	W 4–3	3–3–0
January 16	vs. Swarthmore*	West Park Ice Palace • Philadelphia, Pennsylvania	W 7–0	4–3–0
January 19	at Yale	New Haven, Connecticut	L 0–5	4–4–0 (0–1–0)
January 26	at Columbia	St. Nicholas Rink • New York, New York	W 8–1	5–4–0 (1–1–0)
February 19	at Pennsylvania	West Park Ice Palace • Philadelphia, Pennsylvania	W 4–3	6–4–0 (2–1–0)
February 23	at City College of New York*	St. Nicholas Rink • New York, New York	W 9–2	7–4–0
March 1	vs. Brown	St. Nicholas Rink • New York, New York	L 0–3	7–5–0 (2–2–0)
March 2	vs. Cornell*	West Park Ice Palace • Philadelphia, Pennsylvania	L 2–4	7–6–0
*Non-conference game.
