= 1900–01 Yale Bulldogs men's ice hockey season =

College ice hockey season

Intercollegiate Champion Intercollegiate Hockey Association, Champion
- Conference: 2nd IHA

Record
- Overall: 5–7–1
- Conference: 3–1–0
- Home: 2–5–1
- Road: 1–0–0
- Neutral: 2–2–0

Coaches and captains
- Captain: Alfred Coxe

The 1900–01 Yale Bulldogs men's ice hockey season was the sixth season of play for the program.

== Season ==
Yale finished second in Intercollegiate Hockey Association play but in the two-game series at the end of the year the Elis dominated Brown to claim their third consecutive championship.

The team did not have a coach, however, W.J. Hoysradt served as team manager.

== Roster ==
No.	Nat.	Player	Class	Pos	Height	Weight	DoB	Hometown	Previous team
		William Barnett	Graduate	F
		Ezekiel Bronson	Graduate	F			1878-03-27
	(United States)	Alfred Coxe (C)	Senior	D				Utica, New York
		Fred Inman	Junior	F
		Norman Snow	Junior	F
		Henry Stoddard	Junior	F
		Thomas Sturgis	Sophomore
		James S. Taintor	Senior	G			1879-10-05
	(United States)	G. B. Ward	Junior	D			1878-11-06	Bristol, Connecticut

== Standings ==
1900–01 Collegiate ice hockey standings
	Intercollegiate							Overall					
	GP	W	L	T	PCT.	GF	GA	GP	W	L	T	GF	GA
Brown	9	4	4	1	.500	23	39	9	4	4	1	23	39
City College of New York	–	–	–	–	–	–	–	–	–	–	–	–	–
Columbia	4	1	3	0	.250	7	21	4	1	3	0	7	21
Cornell	3	3	0	0	1.000	12	4	3	3	0	0	12	4
Harvard	3	3	0	0	1.000	14	2	3	3	0	0	14	2
Haverford	–	–	–	–	–	–	–	–	–	–	–	–	–
MIT	1	0	0	1	.500	2	2	–	–	–	–	–	–
Pennsylvania	–	–	–	–	–	–	–	–	–	–	–	–	–
Princeton	7	4	3	0	.571	28	18	13	7	6	0	50	34
Swarthmore	3	1	2	0	.333	5	13	5	2	3	0	10	19
Yale	7	5	2	0	.714	39	6	13	5	7	1	50	39

1900–01 Intercollegiate Hockey Association standings
	Conference							Overall					
	GP	W	L	T	PTS	GF	GA	GP	W	L	T	GF	GA
Brown	4	4	0	0	8	18	3	9	4	4	1	23	39
Yale *	4	3	1	0	6	25	1	13	5	7	1	50	39
Princeton	4	2	2	0	4	12	12	13	7	6	0	50	34
Columbia	4	1	3	0	2	7	21	4	1	3	0	7	21
Pennsylvania	4	0	4	0	0	7	29	–	–	–	–	–	–
* indicates conference champion

== Schedule and results ==
Date	Opponent	Site	Result	Record
Regular season
December 8	St. Nicholas Hockey Club*	New Haven, Connecticut	L 0–7	0–1–0
January 2	at Pittsburgh Bankers*	Duquesne Garden • Pittsburgh, Pennsylvania	T 5–5 ^{OT}	0–1–1
January 3	at Duquesne Country and Athletic Club*	Duquesne Garden • Pittsburgh, Pennsylvania	L 1–5	0–2–1
January 4	at Keystone Bicycle Club*	Duquesne Garden • Pittsburgh, Pennsylvania	L 2–7	0–3–1
January 5	at Pittsburgh Athletic Club*	Duquesne Garden • Pittsburgh, Pennsylvania	L 2–6	0–4–1
January 7	at Quaker City Hockey Club*	West Park Ice Palace • Philadelphia, Pennsylvania	L 1–3	0–5–1
January 19	vs. Princeton	St. Nicholas Rink • New York, New York	W 5–0	1–5–1 (1–0–0)
February 2	vs. Pennsylvania	St. Nicholas Rink • New York, New York	W 15–0	2–5–1 (2–0–0)
February 7	vs. Brown	St. Nicholas Rink • New York, New York	L 0–1	2–6–1 (2–1–0)
February 11	vs. Harvard*	St. Nicholas Rink • New York, New York (Rivalry)	L 0–4	2–7–1
February 16	at Columbia	St. Nicholas Rink • New York, New York	W 5–0	3–7–1 (3–1–0)
March 16	Brown*	New Haven, Connecticut (IHA Championship Game 1)	W 9–0	4–7–1
March 20	Brown*	New Haven, Connecticut (IHA Championship Game 2)	W 5–1	5–7–1
*Non-conference game.
