= 1900–01 Penn Quakers men's ice hockey season =

- Conference: 5th IHA
- Home ice: West Park Ice Palace

Record
- Overall: 1–5–0
- Conference: 0–4–0
- Home: 1–3–0
- Road: 0–1–0
- Neutral: 0–1–0

Coaches and captains
- Captain(s): Frank Kier; Charles Klahr; William Wallace

The 1900–01 Penn Quakers men's ice hockey season was the 4th season of play for the program.

== Season ==
With the reopening of the West Park Ice Palace, the Quakers ice hockey team was able to return as well. The club rejoined the Intercollegiate Hockey Association.

The team did not have a head coach but J. A. Standen served as team manager.

After the season the West Park Ice Palace burned down, leaving the team without a home. Due to the expense of keeping up the team, and the large debt of the athletic department, the ice hockey program was mothballed for several years.

== Roster ==
No.	Nat.	Player	Class	Pos	Height	Weight	DoB	Hometown	Previous team
		George B. Atlee	Junior	C/D
		Silas G. Climenson	Senior	G
		Daniel F. Brown	Sophomore	C
		W. Brown		C
		John A. Freeland	Sophomore	RW
		William G. Gardiner Jr.	Sophomore	D			1880-01-27
		Frank J. Kier (C)	Sophomore	R/D/G
		Leon C. Long	Sophomore	G
	(United States)	Norman C. Mills	Junior	R			1877-11-16	Brookville, Pennsylvania
		J. Arthur Standen	Junior	D			1881-02-14
		William E. Wallace (C)	Senior	R
		William B. Whetstone	Sophomore	LW			1879-01-08

== Standings ==
1900–01 Collegiate ice hockey standings
	Intercollegiate							Overall					
	GP	W	L	T	PCT.	GF	GA	GP	W	L	T	GF	GA
Brown	9	4	4	1	.500	23	39	9	4	4	1	23	39
City College of New York	–	–	–	–	–	–	–	–	–	–	–	–	–
Columbia	4	1	3	0	.250	7	21	4	1	3	0	7	21
Cornell	3	3	0	0	1.000	12	4	3	3	0	0	12	4
Harvard	3	3	0	0	1.000	14	2	3	3	0	0	14	2
Haverford	–	–	–	–	–	–	–	–	–	–	–	–	–
MIT	1	0	0	1	.500	2	2	–	–	–	–	–	–
Pennsylvania	–	–	–	–	–	–	–	–	–	–	–	–	–
Princeton	7	4	3	0	.571	28	18	13	7	6	0	50	34
Swarthmore	3	1	2	0	.333	5	13	5	2	3	0	10	19
Yale	7	5	2	0	.714	39	6	13	5	7	1	50	39

1900–01 Intercollegiate Hockey Association standings
	Conference							Overall					
	GP	W	L	T	PTS	GF	GA	GP	W	L	T	GF	GA
Brown	4	4	0	0	8	18	3	9	4	4	1	23	39
Yale *	4	3	1	0	6	25	1	13	5	7	1	50	39
Princeton	4	2	2	0	4	12	12	13	7	6	0	50	34
Columbia	4	1	3	0	2	7	21	4	1	3	0	7	21
Pennsylvania	4	0	4	0	0	7	29	–	–	–	–	–	–
* indicates conference champion

== Schedule and results ==
Date	Opponent	Site	Result	Record
Regular Season
December 20	vs. Quaker City Hockey Club*	West Park Ice Palace • Philadelphia, Pennsylvania	?	
January 4	vs. Bala Cricket Club*	West Park Ice Palace • Philadelphia, Pennsylvania	W 3–2	1–0–0
January 8	vs. Haverford	West Park Ice Palace • Philadelphia, Pennsylvania	?	
January 18	at Brown	West Park Ice Palace • Philadelphia, Pennsylvania	L 0–7 †	1–1–0 (0–1–0)
February 2	vs. Yale	St. Nicholas Rink • New York, New York	L 0–15	1–2–0 (0–2–0)
February 12	vs. Swarthmore	West Park Ice Palace • Philadelphia, Pennsylvania	L 2–4	1–3–0
February 19	vs. Princeton	West Park Ice Palace • Philadelphia, Pennsylvania	L 3–4	1–4–0 (0–3–0)
February 22	at Columbia	St. Nicholas Rink • New York, New York	L 2–4	1–5–0 (0–4–0)
February 25	vs. Pittsburgh All-Scholastic Team	West Park Ice Palace • Philadelphia, Pennsylvania	?	
March 1	vs. Cornell*	West Park Ice Palace • Philadelphia, Pennsylvania	L 1–4	1–6–0
*Non-conference game.

Note: Games with no score were scheduled but it's unclear whether or not they were played.
† Brown records the score of the game as 6–2.
