= 1898–99 Brown men's ice hockey season =

- Conference: 3rd IHA

Record
- Overall: 3–2–0
- Conference: 1–2–0
- Home: 1–0–0
- Road: 2–2–0

Coaches and captains
- Captain: Irving Hunt

The 1898–99 Brown men's ice hockey season was the 2nd season of play for the program.

== Season ==
While Brown continued to play most of their games on the road, the men's team did play their first game at home, hosting Harvard on the first of February. This was the last time Brown finished with a winning record until 1929.

Note: Brown University did not formally adopt the Bear as its mascot until the fall of 1905.

== Roster ==
No.	Nat.	Player	Class	Pos	Height	Weight	DoB	Hometown	Previous team
	(United States)	LeRoy Bartlett	Freshman	F			1880-12-17	Kingston, Rhode Island
	(United States)	William Bates	Sophomore				1879-01-07	Providence, Rhode Island
		Julian Chase	Senior
		Charles Cooke	Senior
		Henderson Goldsborough	Freshman
	(United States)	Irving Hunt (C)	Senior	F			1878-01-30	Providence, Rhode Island
		James Kent	Senior
		Harold MacKinney	Freshman
		Harry Paine	Freshman	F
	(United States)	Jesse Pevear	Senior				1877-05-26	Lynn, Massachusetts
	(United States)	Theodore Pevear	Freshman				1881-03-05	Lynn, Massachusetts
		Arthur Slocum	Sophomore	D
		Robert Steere	Sophomore	D
		George Taylor	Sophomore
		Raymer Weeden	Senior

== Standings ==
1898–99 Collegiate ice hockey standings
	Intercollegiate							Overall					
	GP	W	L	T	PCT.	GF	GA	GP	W	L	T	GF	GA
Brown	4	2	2	0	.500	9	8	5	3	2	0	13	9
Columbia	3	0	3	0	.000	2	7	5	2	3	0		
Harvard	1	0	1	0	.000	1	2	1	0	1	0	1	2
Pennsylvania	–	–	–	–	–	–	–	–	–	–	–	–	–
Western University of Pennsylvania	–	–	–	–	–	–	–	–	–	–	–	–	–
Yale	5	5	0	0	1.000	17	8	6	6	0	0	21	8

1898–99 Intercollegiate Hockey Association standings
	Conference							Overall					
	GP	W	L	T	PTS	GF	GA	GP	W	L	T	GF	GA
Yale	3	3	0	0	6	10	4	6	6	0	0	21	8
Pennsylvania	3	2	1	0	4	7	6	–	–	–	–	–	–
Brown	3	1	2	0	2	5	7	5	3	2	0	13	9
Columbia	3	0	3	0	0	2	7	5	2	3	0		

== Schedule and results ==
Date	Opponent	Site	Result	Record
Regular Season
January 20	at Pennsylvania	West Park Ice Palace • Philadelphia, Pennsylvania	L 0–3	0–1–0 (0–1–0)
January 28	at Newtowne Athletic Club*	West Park Ice Palace • Philadelphia, Pennsylvania	W 4–1	1–1–0
February 1	Harvard*	Aldrich Field Rink • Providence, Rhode Island	W 4–1	2–1–0
February 4	at Yale	New Haven, Connecticut	L 3–4	2–2–0 (0–2–0)
February 18	at Columbia	St. Nicholas Rink • New York, New York	W 2–0	3–2–0 (1–2–0)
*Non-conference game.
