= 1898–99 Penn Quakers men's ice hockey season =

- Conference: 2nd IHA
- Home ice: West Park Ice Palace

Record
- Overall: 4–2–0
- Conference: 2–1–0
- Home: 4–0–0
- Road: 0–2–0

Coaches and captains
- Captain: William Wallace

The 1898–99 Penn Quakers men's ice hockey season was the 3rd season of play for the program.

== Season ==
Penn was to open its season in mid-December against the Quaker City Hockey Club, an organization captained by program founder George Orton, but the school's athletic department refused to allow the team to play. shortly afterwards the university opted to officially recognize the team for the first time. With this official approval also came the insistence that Penn join the Intercollegiate Hockey Association and play against the likes of Yale and Brown. While those plans were being ironed out the Philadelphia Hockey League, of which Penn was still a member, replaced Haverford College with Central High School and arranged inter-squad games between each of the four clubs. In late December a team composed of current and former Quaker members played Yale, losing 3–4. The game had been arranged earlier but as many Quaker players had returned home for the holidays the team needed to use graduates as replacements.

When the team finally played its first official game on January 10 they opened with a bang, defeating Central High School 12–0. The Quakers played well through several games but after the managers of the West Park Ice Palace failed to carry through on an agreement for a benefit night the school refused to use the rink for the remainder of the season.

The team did not have a head coach but Benjamin Parish served as team manager.

In December of the following year the Athletic department released the figures for all of the athletic programs the university supported. They did this due to the $12,000 deficit the school had incurred from all programs over the previous fiscal year. The ice hockey team cost the school $210 to support, seventh out of ten programs, but the team had brought in just $38 in gate receipts. With the debt from the school's athletic department mounting, combined with the closing of the West Park Ice Palace, the ice hockey team was suspended as a luxury that it could not afford.

== Roster ==
No.	Nat.	Player	Class	Pos	Height	Weight	DoB	Hometown	Previous team
		William Agnew	Senior	RW
		Cross	Junior	D
		Laing	Junior	C
		Long	Senior	LW
		Arthur Moore	Senior	G
		Arthur Stackhouse	Senior	D
		William E. Wallace (C)	Junior	R

== Standings ==
1898–99 Collegiate ice hockey standings
	Intercollegiate							Overall					
	GP	W	L	T	PCT.	GF	GA	GP	W	L	T	GF	GA
Brown	4	2	2	0	.500	9	8	5	3	2	0	13	9
Columbia	3	0	3	0	.000	2	7	5	2	3	0		
Harvard	1	0	1	0	.000	1	2	1	0	1	0	1	2
Pennsylvania	–	–	–	–	–	–	–	–	–	–	–	–	–
Western University of Pennsylvania	–	–	–	–	–	–	–	–	–	–	–	–	–
Yale	5	5	0	0	1.000	17	8	6	6	0	0	21	8

1898–99 Intercollegiate Hockey Association standings
	Conference							Overall					
	GP	W	L	T	PTS	GF	GA	GP	W	L	T	GF	GA
Yale	3	3	0	0	6	10	4	6	6	0	0	21	8
Pennsylvania	3	2	1	0	4	7	6	–	–	–	–	–	–
Brown	3	1	2	0	2	5	7	5	3	2	0	13	9
Columbia	3	0	3	0	0	2	7	5	2	3	0		

== Schedule and results ==
Date	Opponent	Site	Result	Record
Regular Season
December 23	at Yale*	New Haven, Connecticut	L 3–4	0–1–0
January 10	vs. Central High School*	West Park Ice Palace • Philadelphia, Pennsylvania	W 12–0	1–1–0
January 20	Brown	West Park Ice Palace • Philadelphia, Pennsylvania	W 3–0	2–1–0 (1–0–0)
January 28	at Yale	New Haven, Connecticut	L 1–4	2–2–0 (1–1–0)
February 3	Columbia	West Park Ice Palace • Philadelphia, Pennsylvania	W 3–2	3–2–0 (2–1–0)
February 10	All-Scholastic Hockey Team*	West Park Ice Palace • Philadelphia, Pennsylvania	W 2–1	4–2–0 (2–1–0)
*Non-conference game.
