= 1900–01 Brown men's ice hockey season =

- Conference: 1st IHA

Record
- Overall: 4–4–1
- Conference: 4–0–0
- Home: 0–1–1
- Road: 3–3–0
- Neutral: 1–0–0

Coaches and captains
- Captain: Theodore Pevear

The 1900–01 Brown men's ice hockey season was the 4th season of play for the program.

== Season ==
Brown recovered from a dismal season the year before and entered their game against Yale on March 16 with a chance to win their second collegiate championship. Instead, Brown lost their last two games to the Elis, allowing Yale to claim their third consecutive championship.

This was the final season that Brown finished with at least a .500 record until 1926.

== Roster ==
No.	Nat.	Player	Class	Pos	Height	Weight	DoB	Hometown	Previous team
		Alexander Abbott	Sophomore
	(United States)	William Bates	Senior	F			1879-01-07	Providence, Rhode Island
	(United States)	LeRoy Bartlett	Junior	F			1880-12-17	Kingston, Rhode Island
		Harrison Chase	Senior	G
		William Gray	Freshman
	(United States)	Noble Judah Jr.	Freshman				1884-04-23	Chicago, Illinois
	(United States)	William Low	Senior	D			1879-04-16	Providence, Rhode Island
		Steven Mason	Freshman
		Collin McLeod	Sophomore	F
	(United States)	Horatio Otis	Freshman	F			1883-11-29	Providence, Rhode Island
		Harry Paine	Junior	F
	(United States)	Theodore Pevear (C)	Junior				1881-03-05	Lynn, Massachusetts
		Harry Phillips	Junior	F/D
		Arthur Slocum	Senior	D
		Robert Steere	Senior	D
		George Taylor	Senior

== Standings ==
1900–01 Collegiate ice hockey standings
	Intercollegiate							Overall					
	GP	W	L	T	PCT.	GF	GA	GP	W	L	T	GF	GA
Brown	9	4	4	1	.500	23	39	9	4	4	1	23	39
City College of New York	–	–	–	–	–	–	–	–	–	–	–	–	–
Columbia	4	1	3	0	.250	7	21	4	1	3	0	7	21
Cornell	3	3	0	0	1.000	12	4	3	3	0	0	12	4
Harvard	3	3	0	0	1.000	14	2	3	3	0	0	14	2
Haverford	–	–	–	–	–	–	–	–	–	–	–	–	–
MIT	1	0	0	1	.500	2	2	–	–	–	–	–	–
Pennsylvania	–	–	–	–	–	–	–	–	–	–	–	–	–
Princeton	7	4	3	0	.571	28	18	13	7	6	0	50	34
Swarthmore	3	1	2	0	.333	5	13	5	2	3	0	10	19
Yale	7	5	2	0	.714	39	6	13	5	7	1	50	39

1900–01 Intercollegiate Hockey Association standings
	Conference							Overall					
	GP	W	L	T	PTS	GF	GA	GP	W	L	T	GF	GA
Brown	4	4	0	0	8	18	3	9	4	4	1	23	39
Yale *	4	3	1	0	6	25	1	13	5	7	1	50	39
Princeton	4	2	2	0	4	12	12	13	7	6	0	50	34
Columbia	4	1	3	0	2	7	21	4	1	3	0	7	21
Pennsylvania	4	0	4	0	0	7	29	–	–	–	–	–	–
* indicates conference champion

== Schedule and results ==
Date	Opponent	Site	Result	Record
Regular Season
January 18	at Pennsylvania	West Park Ice Palace • Philadelphia, Pennsylvania	W 6–2	1–0–0 (1–0–0)
January 23	Harvard*	Aldrich Field Rink • Providence, Rhode Island	L 0–1	1–1–0
February 2	at Harvard*	Soldiers Field • Boston, Massachusetts	L 2–9	1–2–0
February 7	at Yale	St. Nicholas Rink • New York, New York	W 1–0	2–2–0 (2–0–0)
February 20	MIT*	Aldrich Field Rink • Providence, Rhode Island	T 2–2	2–2–1
March 1	vs. Princeton	St. Nicholas Rink • New York, New York	W 3–0	3–2–1 (3–0–0)
March 2	at Columbia	St. Nicholas Rink • New York, New York	W 8–2	4–2–1 (4–0–0)
March 16	at Yale*	St. Nicholas Rink • New York, New York (IHA Championship Game 1)	L 0–9	4–3–1
March 20	at Yale*	St. Nicholas Rink • New York, New York (IHA Championship Game 2)	L 1–5	4–4–1
*Non-conference game.
