= 1900–01 Columbia men's ice hockey season =

- Conference: 4th IHA
- Home ice: St. Nicholas Rink

Record
- Overall: 1–3–0
- Conference: 1–3–0
- Home: 1–3–0

Coaches and captains
- Captain: George Eyer

The 1900–01 Columbia men's ice hockey season was the 5th season of play for the program.

== Season ==
Prior to the Holiday break, team manager R. S. Woodward asked the university's permission for the ice hockey team to travel to Pittsburgh for a 4-game set against local athletic clubs. He did so because the ice hockey club was $75 in debt and the team was being offered $400 for the cost of expenses for the trip. Because the trip would take place during the school term, and because Columbia University policy prohibited any person or team with an outstanding debt from taking place in a public contest, permission for the trip was denied. Unfortunately the team had already committed itself to participating by signing a contract. As a result, when the team attempted to back out of the trip the Pittsburgh management threatened to sue. In an attempt to satisfy all parties, the ice hockey team reorganized itself as "The Columbia Hockey Club Team" and not as an official representative of the University.

The team traveled to Pittsburgh to complete their terms of the contract before returning home. After the break school administrators ruled that the eight men who had participated had violated university instructions and would be barred from representing Columbia University or participating in any university athletic event for the remainder of the school year. The disqualified students were: R. S. Woodward, A. Lawrence, A. Wolff, D. S. Hudson, A. Coggeshall, S. Campbell, W. Duden and F. X. O'Dwyer.

As a result, the team was forced to reorganize with most of the freshman squad and play out their Intercollegiate Hockey Association schedule. It wasn't much of a surprise when the team took a step back after a solid 1900 season. After the season all members of the team were reinstated with the exception of R. S. Woodward. This was done primarily so that the other teams the players were involved with were not punished as a result of the actions of the ice hockey management. Additionally, the administration expressed its appreciation at the way that the replacement team handled itself during the intercollegiate series.

Note: Columbia University adopted the Lion as its mascot in 1910.

== Roster ==
No.	Nat.	Player	Class	Pos	Height	Weight	DoB	Hometown	Previous team
		Albert J. Akin	Freshman	F
		Clarence W. Bartow	Junior	G
		Alfred C. Benedict	Senior	D
	(United States)	George G. DeWitt	Sophomore	F			1879-07-14	Mainesburg, Pennsylvania
		William Duden	Freshman	D
		John J. Dwyer	Junior
		George A. Eyer (C)	Senior	F
		Holmes
		Douglas McKee	Freshman	F
	(United States)	Rudolph L. von Bernuth	Freshman				1883-12-18	New York, New York

== Standings ==
1900–01 Collegiate ice hockey standings
	Intercollegiate							Overall					
	GP	W	L	T	PCT.	GF	GA	GP	W	L	T	GF	GA
Brown	9	4	4	1	.500	23	39	9	4	4	1	23	39
City College of New York	–	–	–	–	–	–	–	–	–	–	–	–	–
Columbia	4	1	3	0	.250	7	21	4	1	3	0	7	21
Cornell	3	3	0	0	1.000	12	4	3	3	0	0	12	4
Harvard	3	3	0	0	1.000	14	2	3	3	0	0	14	2
Haverford	–	–	–	–	–	–	–	–	–	–	–	–	–
MIT	1	0	0	1	.500	2	2	–	–	–	–	–	–
Pennsylvania	–	–	–	–	–	–	–	–	–	–	–	–	–
Princeton	7	4	3	0	.571	28	18	13	7	6	0	50	34
Swarthmore	3	1	2	0	.333	5	13	5	2	3	0	10	19
Yale	7	5	2	0	.714	39	6	13	5	7	1	50	39

1900–01 Intercollegiate Hockey Association standings
	Conference							Overall					
	GP	W	L	T	PTS	GF	GA	GP	W	L	T	GF	GA
Brown	4	4	0	0	8	18	3	9	4	4	1	23	39
Yale *	4	3	1	0	6	25	1	13	5	7	1	50	39
Princeton	4	2	2	0	4	12	12	13	7	6	0	50	34
Columbia	4	1	3	0	2	7	21	4	1	3	0	7	21
Pennsylvania	4	0	4	0	0	7	29	–	–	–	–	–	–
* indicates conference champion

== Schedule and results ==
Date	Opponent	Site	Result	Record
Regular Season
January 26	Princeton	St. Nicholas Rink • New York, New York	L 1–8	0–1–0 (0–1–0)
February 16	Yale	St. Nicholas Rink • New York, New York	L 0–4 †	0–2–0 (0–2–0)
February 22	Pennsylvania	St. Nicholas Rink • New York, New York	W 4–2 ^{OT}	1–2–0 (1–2–0)
March 2	Brown	St. Nicholas Rink • New York, New York	L 2–7 ‡	1–3–0 (1–3–0)
*Non-conference game.

† Yale records the score of the game as 5–0.
‡ Brown records the score of the game as 8–2.
