= 1898–99 Columbia men's ice hockey season =

- Conference: 4th IHA
- Home ice: St. Nicholas Rink

Record
- Overall: 2–3–0
- Conference: 0–3–0

Coaches and captains
- Captain: Arthur Henderson

The 1898–99 Columbia men's ice hockey season was the 3rd season of play for the program.

== Season ==
Note: Columbia University adopted the Lion as its mascot in 1910.

== Roster ==
No.	Nat.	Player	Class	Pos	Height	Weight	DoB	Hometown	Previous team
		Dwight		D
		George A. Eyer	Sophomore	R
		Arthur M. Henderson (C)	Junior	F
		Huntington		F
		Augustine Lawrence	Sophomore	D
		James Pell	Senior	F
		Albert W. Putnam	Graduate	G

== Standings ==
1898–99 Collegiate ice hockey standings
	Intercollegiate							Overall					
	GP	W	L	T	PCT.	GF	GA	GP	W	L	T	GF	GA
Brown	4	2	2	0	.500	9	8	5	3	2	0	13	9
Columbia	3	0	3	0	.000	2	7	5	2	3	0		
Harvard	1	0	1	0	.000	1	2	1	0	1	0	1	2
Pennsylvania	–	–	–	–	–	–	–	–	–	–	–	–	–
Western University of Pennsylvania	–	–	–	–	–	–	–	–	–	–	–	–	–
Yale	5	5	0	0	1.000	17	8	6	6	0	0	21	8

1898–99 Intercollegiate Hockey Association standings
	Conference							Overall					
	GP	W	L	T	PTS	GF	GA	GP	W	L	T	GF	GA
Yale	3	3	0	0	6	10	4	6	6	0	0	21	8
Pennsylvania	3	2	1	0	4	7	6	–	–	–	–	–	–
Brown	3	1	2	0	2	5	7	5	3	2	0	13	9
Columbia	3	0	3	0	0	2	7	5	2	3	0		

== Schedule and results ==
Date	Opponent	Site	Result	Record
Regular Season
	?		W	1–0–0
December 20	Cutler's School*	St. Nicholas Rink • New York, New York	W 5–0	2–0–0
January 25	at Yale	Clermont Avenue Skating Rink • Brooklyn, New York	L 0–2	2–1–0 (0–1–0)
February 3	at Pennsylvania	West Park Ice Palace • Philadelphia, Pennsylvania	L 2–3	2–2–0 (0–2–0)
February 18	Brown	St. Nicholas Rink • New York, New York	L 0–2	2–3–0 (0–3–0)
*Non-conference game.
