= 1896–97 Yale Bulldogs men's ice hockey season =

College ice hockey season

Record
- Overall: 2–6–1
- Road: 2–5–1
- Neutral: 0–1–0

Coaches and captains
- Captain: Amos Barnes

The 1896–97 Yale Bulldogs men's ice hockey season was the second season of play for the program.

== Season ==
Though the team had lost its founder and driving force to graduation (Malcolm Greene Chace), Yale continued to support it's men's hockey team. The second season saw a series of firsts for the program, including its first home game, its first game against an eventual Ivy League member and its first losing season. The team did not have a coach, however, John Hall served as team manager.

Most of Yale's games were played against amateur athletic clubs but all games were counted for the Bulldogs' record.

== Roster ==
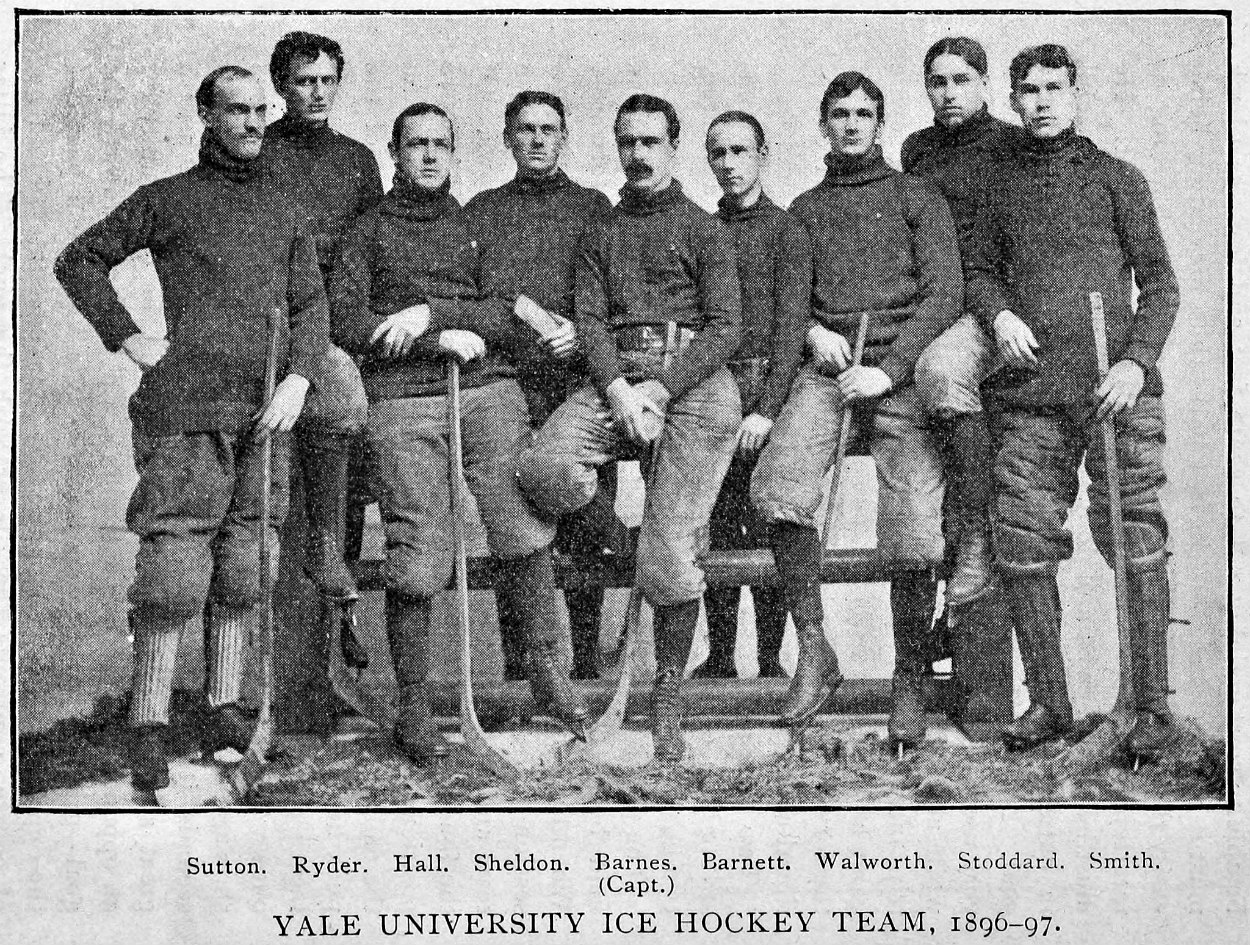
Yale University hockey team in 1896–97. From left: Herbert Sutton, Henry Ryder, John Hall, George Sheldon, Amos Barnes, William Barnett, Clarence Walworth, Sanford Stoddard, Robert Smith.

No.	Nat.	Player	Class	Pos	Height	Weight	DoB	Hometown	Previous team
	(United States)	Amos Barnes (C)	Senior				1875-06-05	New Haven, Connecticut
		William Barnett	Junior	F			1876-09-26
		Clarence Fincke	Senior	D			1874-10-12
	(United States)	John Hall	Junior	D			1877-09-16	Pittsburgh, Pennsylvania
	(United States)	Henry Ryder	Senior				1875-02-04	Plainfield, New Jersey
		George Sheldon Jr.					1876-11-19
		Robert Smith	Sophomore	G
	(United States)	Sanford Stoddard	Sophomore	F			1877-10-11	Bridgeport, Connecticut
	(United States)	Herbert Sutton	Senior	D			1874-08-30	New Haven, Connecticut
	(United States)	Clarence Walworth	Freshman	F			1878-05-04	Newton Center, Massachusetts

== Standings ==
1896–97 Collegiate ice hockey standings
	Intercollegiate							Overall					
	GP	W	L	T	PCT.	GF	GA	GP	W	L	T	GF	GA
Pennsylvania	1	1	0	0	1.000	5	0	1	1	0	0	5	0
Maryland	1	1	0	0	1.000	3	1	–	–	–	–	–	–
Yale	2	1	0	1	.750	9	4	9	2	6	1	17	31
Johns Hopkins	2	0	1	1	.250	3	5	8	2	5	1	16	25
Columbia	2	0	2	0	.000	2	12	5	2	3	0	5	17

== Schedule and results ==
Date	Opponent	Site	Result	Record
Regular season
December 16	at Montclair Athletic Club*	Clermont Avenue Skating Rink • Brooklyn, New York	L 1–6	0–1–0
December 24	at St. Nicholas Hockey Club*	St. Nicholas Rink • New York, New York	L 2–3	0–2–0
January 8	at Johns Hopkins*	North Avenue Ice Palace • Baltimore, Maryland	T 2–2	0–2–1
January 9	at Baltimore Hockey Club*	North Avenue Ice Palace • Baltimore, Maryland	W 3–0	1–2–1
January 13	at New York Athletic Club*	St. Nicholas Rink • New York, New York	L 1–7	1–3–1
January 23	vs. Queen's*	St. Nicholas Rink • New York, New York	L 0–3	1–4–1
February 13	at New York Athletic Club*	St. Nicholas Rink • New York, New York	L 0–5	1–5–1
March 13	at St. Nicholas Hockey Club*	St. Nicholas Rink • New York, New York	L 1–3	1–6–1
March 27	at Columbia*	St. Nicholas Rink • New York, New York	W 7–2	2–6–1
*Non-conference game.
