= Rudolph von Bernuth =

American ice hockey player and coach

Biographical details
- Born: December 18, 1883; New York City, US
- Died: May 2, 1969 (aged 85); Flushing, New York, US
- Education: Columbia University; B.S. '03, LL.M. '06

Playing career
- 1900–1904: Columbia
- 1917–1918: New York Hockey Club
- 1921–1922: St. Nicholas Hockey Club

Coaching career (HC unless noted)
- 1905–1906: Columbia
- 1906–1907: Columbia (assistant)
- 1907–1910: Columbia
- 1913–1915: Columbia

Administrative career (AD unless noted)
- 1915–1917: AAHL (governor)
- ?: USAHA (governor)

Head coaching record
- Overall: 10–27–2 (.282)

Rudolph Ludwig (Pop) von Bernuth Jr. (April 19, 1883 – May 2, 1969) was an American ice hockey player, coach and administrator, as well as a practicing attorney, for many years.

== Career ==
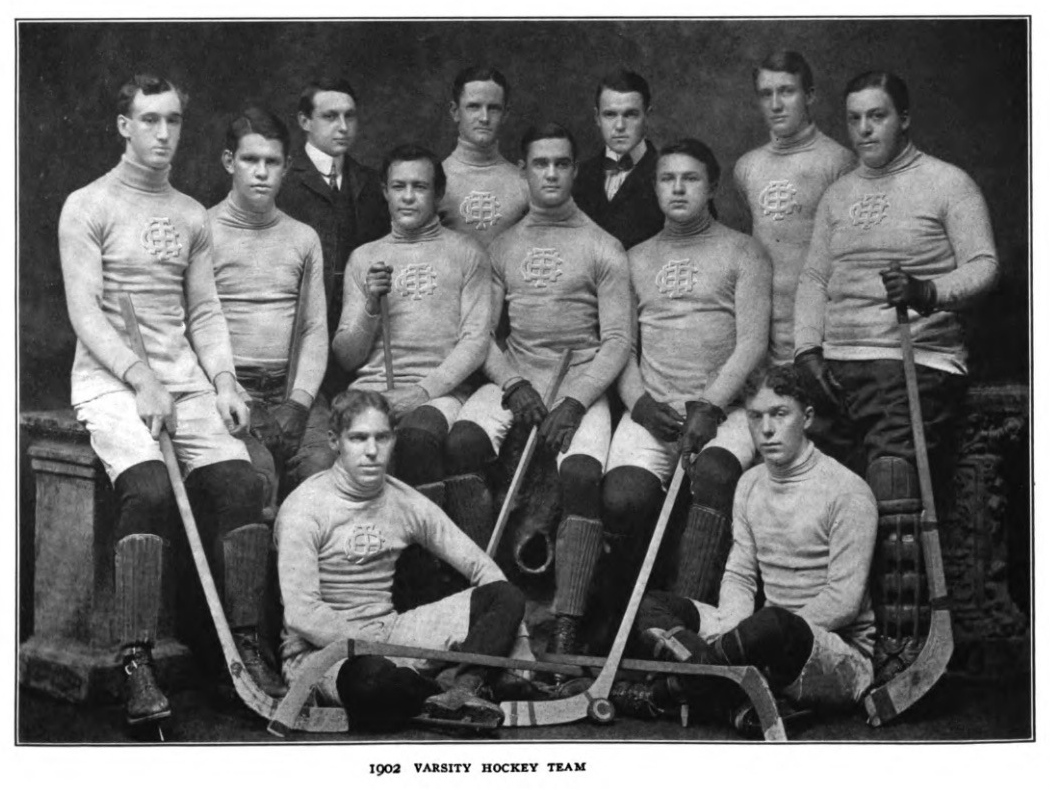
Bernuth (second from left) on the 1901–02 Columbia team

von Bernuth began attending Columbia University in the fall of 1900 as a 16-year-old. Despite his youth, he swiftly became a fixture on several athletic teams, joining the crew and track and field squads. However, he would make his greatest impact as a member of the ice hockey team. Bernuth first appeared for Columbia's hockey team as a reserve player in 1901, the same year that the school suspended eight starting players for participating in unsanctioned games. The loss of their leading men forced the team to rely more heavily on underclassmen, including von Bernuth. Despite the difficulties of his first experience, von Bernuth took to the game and became the team's starting goaltender as a sophomore. Though tall (Bernuth stood 6'3"), he was an inexperienced goaltender and he could not help Columbia win many games over the next two seasons. After graduating from Columbia College a year early in 1903, von Bernuth remained at the university by entering Columbia Law School. He played one final year as the team's netminder, backstopping Columbia to the only 5-win season in program history.

von Bernuth spent the succeeding two years earning his law degree. During his final year at Columbia, the hockey team came calling once more and he served as the team's first head coach, though only on a volunteer basis. After graduating in 1906, von Bernuth took a step back, serving as an assistant coach while he began to establish his legal practice. Unfortunately, Columbia had its worst performance that season and the man brought in to replace him departed soon thereafter. Bernuth then served as head coach for the next three seasons but could only get the team to win a single game each year. von Bernuth left the team after 1910 when the school brought in NHA veteran Percy LeSueur on a part-time basis. The move looked like it would pay dividends when the Lions posted their first winning season in over a decade, however, the team soon found itself in dire straits. Because Columbia University did not subscribe to the same policy of prohibiting their freshmen students from playing varsity sports, the Lions ice hockey team was removed from the Intercollegiate Hockey Association and lost access to the St. Nicholas Rink. With the team reeling, von Bernuth, and fellow Lions alumnus Rufus Trimble, returned in 1913 as joint head coaches to try and save the program. Unfortunately, the forces arrayed against Columbia were too great for their efforts and the program was shuttered in 1915.

By this time, von Bernuth had become well known in the ice hockey community and was made the governor of the American Amateur Hockey League. After the league folded in 1917, von Bernuth had the opportunity to resume his playing career due to the United States' entry into World War I. Bernuth backstopped the New York Hockey Club to a city championship in 1918, going undefeated in 4 games while allowing just 5 goals. After the war, von Bernuth continued to work both on and off the ice to advance amateur ice hockey. He served as governor for the United States Amateur Hockey Association, the spiritual successor to the American Amateur Hockey League, and helped to formalize the three-zone arrangement still in use for modern Ice hockey rinks. During this time, Bernuth made his final appearances as a player, serving as a backup for the St. Nicholas Hockey Club during the 1921–22 season.

After World War I, von Bernuth established his professional career by joining the law office of Gould & Wilkie in 1918. He would remain with the firm for the rest of his life. While working primarily as a lawyer, von Bernuth also found time to chair the Columbia University committee on athletics, and be an active member of the alumni association. After stepping back from his legal duties in the 1950s, von Bernuth became an oft-seen presence on Columbia's campus. He attended many school functions and remained a champion of Columbia University up until his death in 1969.

== Statistics ==
=== Regular season and playoffs ===
			Regular season
Season	Team	League	GP	W	L	T	OTL	MIN	GA	SO	GAA	SV%
1900–01	Columbia	IHA	—	—	—	—	—	—	—	—	—	—
1901–02	Columbia	IHA	—	—	—	—	—	—	—	—	—	—
1902–03	Columbia	IHA	—	—	—	—	—	—	—	—	—	—
1903–04	Columbia	IHA	—	—	—	—	—	—	—	—	—	—
1917–18	New York Hockey Club	New York City	—	—	—	—	—	—	—	—	—	—
1921–22	St. Nicholas Hockey Club	USAHA	—	—	—	—	—	—	—	—	—	—
NCAA totals			—	—	—	—	—	—	—	—	—	—

== Head coaching record ==
Record table
Season	Team	Overall	Conference	Standing	Postseason
Columbia (IHA) (1905–1906)
1905–06	Columbia	4–7–1	2–2–0	3rd	
Columbia (IHA) (1907–1910)
1907–08	Columbia	1–4–0	1–3–0	T–3rd	
1908–09	Columbia	1–4–0	0–4–0	5th	
1909–10	Columbia	1–5–1	0–5–0	6th	
Columbia Lions (Independent) (1913–1915)
1913–14	Columbia	1–4–0			
1914–15	Columbia	2–2–0			
Columbia:		10–27–2			
Total:		10–27–2			
National champion Postseason invitational champion Conference regular season champion Conference regular season and conference tournament champion Division regular season champion Division regular season and conference tournament champion Conference tournament champion
