= 1896–97 Penn Quakers men's ice hockey season =

- Home ice: West Park Ice Palace

Record
- Overall: 1–0–0
- Road: 1–0–0

Coaches and captains
- Captain: George Orton

The 1896–97 Penn Quakers men's ice hockey season was the inaugural season of play for the program.

== Season ==
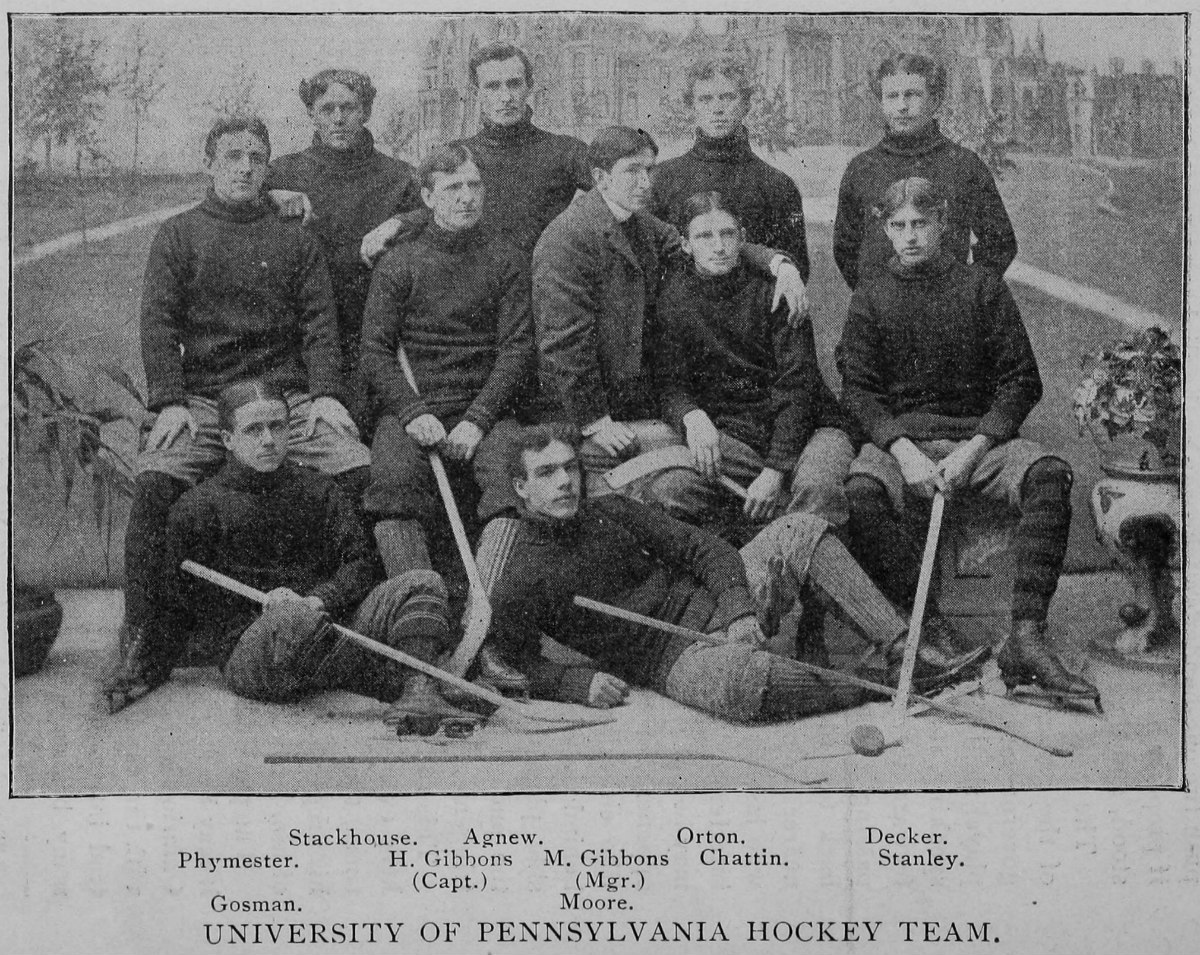
Univ. of Penn team in 1896–97, its first season of existence. Top row, from left: Arthur Stackhouse, William Agnew, George Orton, Clinton Decker. Middle row, from left: William Phymister, Horace Gibbons, Miles Gibbons, John Chattin, Stanley Willett. Bottom row, from left: John Gosman, Arthur Moore.

After seeing Yale and Johns Hopkins play the first intercollegiate game the year before, George Orton a graduate student from Canada, organized the first ice hockey team for Pennsylvania University. The Quakers won their first game against Columbia with William Agnew recording the first hat-trick in program history.

Pennsylvania's season was hampered by a lack of local facilities, something that Orton would fix the following year when he helped build the first indoor rink in the Philadelphia area, the West Park Ice Palace.

== Roster ==
No.	Nat.	Player	Class	Pos	Height	Weight	DoB	Hometown	Previous team
		William Agnew	Sophomore	F
		John Chattin
		Clinton Decker
		Horace Gibbons		F
		John Gosman
		Arthur Moore	Sophomore	G
	(Canada)	George Orton (C)	Graduate	F			1873-01-10	Strathroy, Ontario
		William Phymester		D
		Arthur Stackhouse	Sophomore	F
		Stanley Willett		D

== Standings ==
1896–97 Collegiate ice hockey standings
	Intercollegiate							Overall					
	GP	W	L	T	PCT.	GF	GA	GP	W	L	T	GF	GA
Pennsylvania	1	1	0	0	1.000	5	0	1	1	0	0	5	0
Maryland	1	1	0	0	1.000	3	1	–	–	–	–	–	–
Yale	2	1	0	1	.750	9	4	9	2	6	1	17	31
Johns Hopkins	2	0	1	1	.250	3	5	8	2	5	1	16	25
Columbia	2	0	2	0	.000	2	12	5	2	3	0	5	17

== Schedule and results ==
Date	Opponent	Site	Result	Record
Regular Season
February 27	vs. Columbia*	St. Nicholas Rink • New York, New York	W 5–0	1–0–0
*Non-conference game.
