= 1898–99 Yale Bulldogs men's ice hockey season =

Ice hockey season

Intercollegiate Champion Intercollegiate Hockey Association, Champion
- Conference: 1st IHA

Record
- Overall: 6–0–0
- Conference: 3–0–0
- Home: 5–0–0
- Neutral: 1–0–0

Coaches and captains
- Captain: Sanford Stoddard

The 1898–99 Yale Bulldogs men's ice hockey season was the fourth season of play for the program.

== Season ==
Yale finished the season undefeated, with a 6–0–0 record. They were declared as Champions of the Intercollegiate Hockey League, a loose association of existing college programs.

The team did not have a coach, however, G.S. Mittendorf served as team manager.

== Roster ==
No.	Nat.	Player	Class	Pos	Height	Weight	DoB	Hometown	Previous team
		William L. Barnett	Graduate	F
		John P. Brock	Junior	D
		J. Shiras Campbell	Junior	F
	(United States)	Alfred C. Coxe	Sophomore	D				Utica, New York
		Holkins Palmer					1877-08-01
		Frank E. Seeley	Senior
		Robert E. Smith	Senior	G
	(United States)	Sanford Stoddard (C)	Senior	F			1877-10-11	Bridgeport, Connecticut
	(United States)	Gardner C. Walworth	Junior	F			1878-05-04	Newton Center, Massachusetts

== Standings ==
1898–99 Collegiate ice hockey standings
	Intercollegiate							Overall					
	GP	W	L	T	PCT.	GF	GA	GP	W	L	T	GF	GA
Brown	4	2	2	0	.500	9	8	5	3	2	0	13	9
Columbia	3	0	3	0	.000	2	7	5	2	3	0		
Harvard	1	0	1	0	.000	1	2	1	0	1	0	1	2
Pennsylvania	–	–	–	–	–	–	–	–	–	–	–	–	–
Western University of Pennsylvania	–	–	–	–	–	–	–	–	–	–	–	–	–
Yale	5	5	0	0	1.000	17	8	6	6	0	0	21	8

1898–99 Intercollegiate Hockey Association standings
	Conference							Overall					
	GP	W	L	T	PTS	GF	GA	GP	W	L	T	GF	GA
Yale	3	3	0	0	6	10	4	6	6	0	0	21	8
Pennsylvania	3	2	1	0	4	7	6	–	–	–	–	–	–
Brown	3	1	2	0	2	5	7	5	3	2	0	13	9
Columbia	3	0	3	0	0	2	7	5	2	3	0		

== Schedule and results ==
Date	Opponent	Site	Result	Record
Regular season
December 23	Pennsylvania*	New Haven, Connecticut	W 4–3	1–0–0
January 25	at Columbia	Clermont Avenue Skating Rink • Brooklyn, New York	W 2–0	2–0–0 (1–0–0)
January 28	Pennsylvania	New Haven, Connecticut	W 4–1	3–0–0 (2–0–0)
February 4	Brown	New Haven, Connecticut	W 4–3	4–0–0 (3–0–0)
February 24	Western University of Pennsylvania*	New Haven, Connecticut	W 3–1	5–0–0
February 24	Pittsburgh Athletic Club*	New Haven, Connecticut	W 4–0	6–0–0
*Non-conference game.
