= 1898–99 United States collegiate men's ice hockey season =

- Duration: December 1898– February 1899
- Collegiate champion: Yale

The 1898–99 United States collegiate men's ice hockey season was the 5th season of collegiate ice hockey.

College hockey lost several teams prior to the 1898–99 season, including the first school to field a team (Johns Hopkins University).

== Regular season ==
=== Standings ===
1898–99 Collegiate ice hockey standings
	Intercollegiate							Overall					
	GP	W	L	T	PCT.	GF	GA	GP	W	L	T	GF	GA
Brown	4	2	2	0	.500	9	8	5	3	2	0	13	9
Columbia	3	0	3	0	.000	2	7	5	2	3	0		
Harvard	1	0	1	0	.000	1	2	1	0	1	0	1	2
Pennsylvania	–	–	–	–	–	–	–	–	–	–	–	–	–
Western University of Pennsylvania	–	–	–	–	–	–	–	–	–	–	–	–	–
Yale	5	5	0	0	1.000	17	8	6	6	0	0	21	8

1898–99 Intercollegiate Hockey Association standings
	Conference							Overall					
	GP	W	L	T	PTS	GF	GA	GP	W	L	T	GF	GA
Yale	3	3	0	0	6	10	4	6	6	0	0	21	8
Pennsylvania	3	2	1	0	4	7	6	–	–	–	–	–	–
Brown	3	1	2	0	2	5	7	5	3	2	0	13	9
Columbia	3	0	3	0	0	2	7	5	2	3	0		
