= 1896–97 Columbia men's ice hockey season =

- Home ice: St. Nicholas Rink

Record
- Overall: 2–3–0
- Conference: 0–2–0
- Home: 2–2–0
- Road: 0–1–0

Coaches and captains
- Captain: Bartow Van Voorhis

The 1896–97 Columbia men's ice hockey season was the inaugural season of play for the program. Columbia University became just the third American university to support an ice hockey team.

== Season ==
A year after Yale played the first intercollegiate game against Johns Hopkins, Columbia organized their own team and found that it had sufficient interest to support two full teams. The team played two practice games in December in order to get their feet wet and help the novice players learn the game.

Note: Columbia University adopted the Lion as its mascot in 1910.

== Roster ==
No.	Nat.	Player	Class	Pos	Height	Weight	DoB	Hometown	Previous team
		William Belden	Junior	D
		Elliott		F/D
		Harry Gregg	Sophomore	G
		Harold N. Hall	Sophomore	D
		Orleans Longacre Jr.	Junior	F
		Henry Coit Mortimer	Junior	F
		O'Connor		F
		Joseph O'Dwyer	Graduate	F
		James Pell	Sophomore	F
		Albert W. Putnam	Senior	G
		Bartow Van Voorhis (C)	Junior	F
		John T. Williams	Junior	D

== Standings ==
1896–97 Collegiate ice hockey standings
	Intercollegiate							Overall					
	GP	W	L	T	PCT.	GF	GA	GP	W	L	T	GF	GA
Pennsylvania	1	1	0	0	1.000	5	0	1	1	0	0	5	0
Maryland	1	1	0	0	1.000	3	1	–	–	–	–	–	–
Yale	2	1	0	1	.750	9	4	9	2	6	1	17	31
Johns Hopkins	2	0	1	1	.250	3	5	8	2	5	1	16	25
Columbia	2	0	2	0	.000	2	12	5	2	3	0	5	17

== Schedule and results ==
Date	Opponent	Site	Result	Record
Regular Season
February 27	Pennsylvania*	St. Nicholas Rink • New York, New York	L 0–5	0–1–0 (0–1–0)
March 16	vs. Naval Reserves*	St. Nicholas Rink • New York, New York	W 2–0	1–1–0
March 23	vs. Staten Island Cricket Club*	St. Nicholas Rink • New York, New York	W 1–0	2–1–0
	at Montclair Athletic Club*	Clermont Avenue Skating Rink • Brooklyn, New York	L 1–5	2–2–0
March 27	Yale*	St. Nicholas Rink • New York, New York	L 2–7	2–3–0 (0–2–0)
*Non-conference game.
