= 1900–01 Cornell men's ice hockey season =

- Home ice: West Park Ice Palace (Philadelphia)

Record
- Overall: 3–0–0
- Road: 1–0–0
- Neutral: 2–0–0

Coaches and captains
- Head coach: G. A. Smith
- Captain: Herbert Wood

The 1900–01 Cornell men's ice hockey season was the 2nd season of play for the program.

== Season ==
Towards the end of the school year, Cornell sent an ice hockey team, under the guidance of G. A. Smith, to Philadelphia for a set of three games over four days. Cornell won each contest to finish the season undefeated, but with the small number of games they were ineligible for the collegiate championship.

G. A. Smith may be the first official head coach for any college hockey team.

Note: Cornell University did not formally adopt 'Big Red' as its moniker until after 1905. They have been, however, associated with 'Carnelian and White' since the school's Inauguration Day on October 7, 1868.

== Roster ==
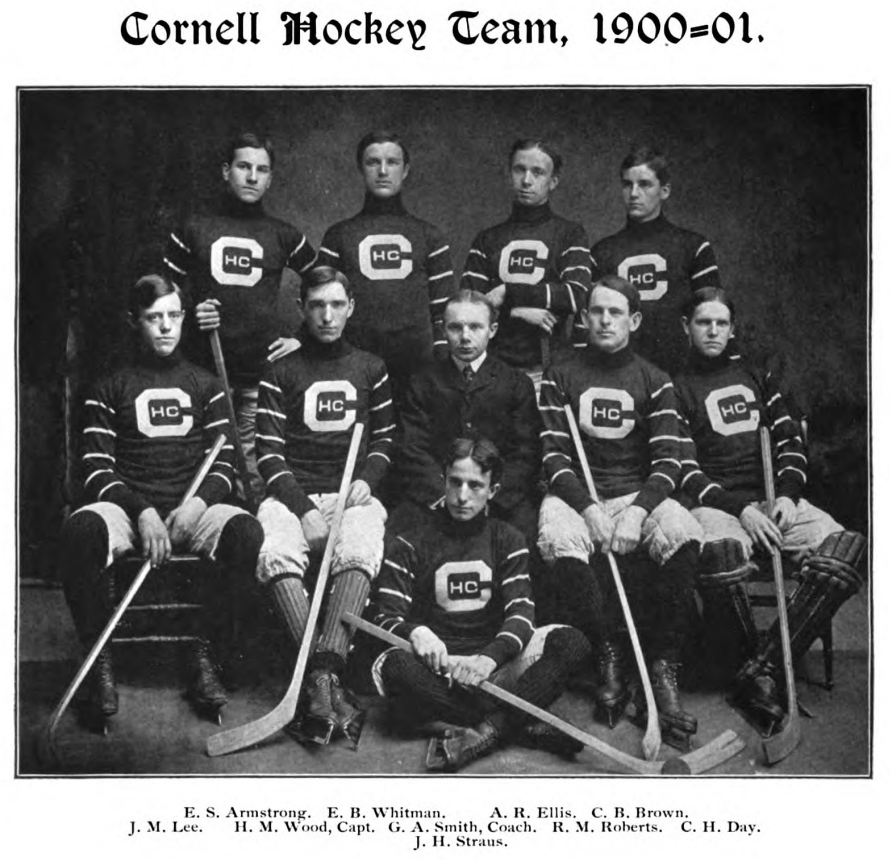
Cornell University team in 1900–01. Top to bottom row from left: Ervin Armstrong, Ezra Whitman, Albert Ellis, Charles Brown, John Lee, Herbert Wood, G. A. Smith, Roger Roberts, Charles Day, Joseph Straus.

| No. | Nat. | Player | Class | Pos | Height | Weight | DoB | Hometown | Previous team |
|---|---|---|---|---|---|---|---|---|---|
| | | Ervin Armstrong | Freshman | F | | | 1883-08-16 |
| | | Charles Brown | | F | | | 1882-05-11 |
| | (United States) | Charles Day | Sophomore | G | | | 1883-02-18 | Providence, Rhode Island |
| | | Albert Ellis | Freshman | D | | | 1881-04-17 |
| | | John Lee | Sophomore | F | | | 1879-01-03 |
| | (United States) | Roger Roberts | | F | | | 1872-07-12 | Ithaca, New York |
| | (United States) | Joseph Straus Jr. | | D | | | 1880-09-03 | Baltimore, Maryland |
| | (United States) | Ezra Whitman | | F | | | 1880-02-19 | Baltimore, Maryland |
| | (Canada) | Herbert Wood (C) | Junior | F | | | 1877-05-10 | Sackville, New Brunswick |

== Standings ==
1900–01 Collegiate ice hockey standings
| | Intercollegiate | | | | | | | Overall | | | | | |
| | GP | W | L | T | PCT. | GF | GA | GP | W | L | T | GF | GA |
|---|---|---|---|---|---|---|---|---|---|---|---|---|---|
| Brown | 9 | 4 | 4 | 1 | .500 | 23 | 39 | 9 | 4 | 4 | 1 | 23 | 39 |
| City College of New York | – | – | – | – | – | – | – | – | – | – | – | – | – |
| Columbia | 4 | 1 | 3 | 0 | .250 | 7 | 21 | 4 | 1 | 3 | 0 | 7 | 21 |
| Cornell | 3 | 3 | 0 | 0 | 1.000 | 12 | 4 | 3 | 3 | 0 | 0 | 12 | 4 |
| Harvard | 3 | 3 | 0 | 0 | 1.000 | 14 | 2 | 3 | 3 | 0 | 0 | 14 | 2 |
| Haverford | – | – | – | – | – | – | – | – | – | – | – | – | – |
| MIT | 1 | 0 | 0 | 1 | .500 | 2 | 2 | – | – | – | – | – | – |
| Pennsylvania | – | – | – | – | – | – | – | – | – | – | – | – | – |
| Princeton | 7 | 4 | 3 | 0 | .571 | 28 | 18 | 13 | 7 | 6 | 0 | 50 | 34 |
| Swarthmore | 3 | 1 | 2 | 0 | .333 | 5 | 13 | 5 | 2 | 3 | 0 | 10 | 19 |
| Yale | 7 | 5 | 2 | 0 | .714 | 39 | 6 | 13 | 5 | 7 | 1 | 50 | 39 |

== Schedule and results ==
| Date | Opponent | Site | Result | Record |
Regular Season
| February 28 | vs. Swarthmore | West Park Ice Palace • Philadelphia, Pennsylvania | W 4–1 | 1–0–0 |
| March 1 | at Pennsylvania | West Park Ice Palace • Philadelphia, Pennsylvania | W 4–1 | 2–0–0 |
| March 3 | vs. Princeton | West Park Ice Palace • Philadelphia, Pennsylvania | W 4–2 | 3–0–0 |
*Non-conference game.
