= 1900–01 Harvard Crimson men's ice hockey season =

College ice hockey season

- Conference: Independent

Record
- Overall: 3–0–0
- Home: 1–0–0
- Road: 1–0–0
- Neutral: 1–0–0

Coaches and captains
- Captain: William Laverack

The 1900–01 Harvard Crimson men's ice hockey season was the fourth season of play for the program.

== Season ==
Harvard finished the season with an undefeated record, however, they played just three games against two different opponents.

== Roster ==
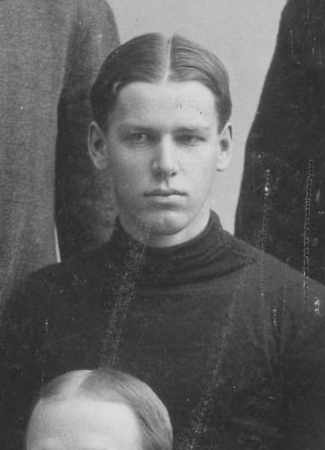
Alfred Winsor with the Harvard ice hockey team.

No.	Nat.	Player	Class	Pos	Height	Weight	DoB	Hometown	Previous team
	(United States)	George W. Canterbury	Senior	F			1878-02-25	Boston, Massachusetts
	(United States)	Frederick Goodridge	Graduate	F			1873-10-26	Cambridge, Massachusetts
	(United States)	Roger Hardy	Senior	F/D			1878-01-18	Brookline, Massachusetts
	(United States)	William Laverack (C)	Junior	F			1879-05-31	Lewiston, New York
	(United States)	John Manning	Sophomore	G			1879-06-03	Boston, Massachusetts
		Dunlap Penhallow	Sophomore	D			1880-08-09
	(United States)	Robert Pruyn	Junior	F			1879-10-11	Albany, New York
	(United States)	Charles Rumsey	Junior	F			1879-08-29	Buffalo, New York
	(United States)	Alfred Winsor	Junior	F			1880-01-08	Brookline, Massachusetts

== Standings ==
1900–01 Collegiate ice hockey standings
	Intercollegiate							Overall					
	GP	W	L	T	PCT.	GF	GA	GP	W	L	T	GF	GA
Brown	9	4	4	1	.500	23	39	9	4	4	1	23	39
City College of New York	–	–	–	–	–	–	–	–	–	–	–	–	–
Columbia	4	1	3	0	.250	7	21	4	1	3	0	7	21
Cornell	3	3	0	0	1.000	12	4	3	3	0	0	12	4
Harvard	3	3	0	0	1.000	14	2	3	3	0	0	14	2
Haverford	–	–	–	–	–	–	–	–	–	–	–	–	–
MIT	1	0	0	1	.500	2	2	–	–	–	–	–	–
Pennsylvania	–	–	–	–	–	–	–	–	–	–	–	–	–
Princeton	7	4	3	0	.571	28	18	13	7	6	0	50	34
Swarthmore	3	1	2	0	.333	5	13	5	2	3	0	10	19
Yale	7	5	2	0	.714	39	6	13	5	7	1	50	39

== Schedule and results ==
Date	Opponent	Site	Result	Record
Regular Season
January 23	at Brown*	Aldrich Field Rink • Providence, Rhode Island	W 1–0	1–0–0
February 2	Brown*	Soldiers Field • Boston, Massachusetts	W 9–2	2–0–0
February 17	vs. Yale*	St. Nicholas Rink • New York, New York (Rivalry)	W 4–0	3–0–0
*Non-conference game.
