= 1896–97 United States collegiate men's ice hockey season =

- Duration: December 1896– March 1897

The 1896–97 United States collegiate men's ice hockey season was the 3rd season of collegiate ice hockey.

Columbia University and Pennsylvania University fielded teams for the first time but with only four programs in existence most games were played against non-college opponents.

== Regular season ==
=== Standings ===
1896–97 Collegiate ice hockey standings
	Intercollegiate							Overall					
	GP	W	L	T	PCT.	GF	GA	GP	W	L	T	GF	GA
Pennsylvania	1	1	0	0	1.000	5	0	1	1	0	0	5	0
Maryland	1	1	0	0	1.000	3	1	–	–	–	–	–	–
Yale	2	1	0	1	.750	9	4	9	2	6	1	17	31
Johns Hopkins	2	0	1	1	.250	3	5	8	2	5	1	16	25
Columbia	2	0	2	0	.000	2	12	5	2	3	0	5	17
