= 1900–01 United States collegiate men's ice hockey season =

- Duration: November 1900– March 1901
- Collegiate champion: Yale

The 1900–01 United States collegiate men's ice hockey season was the 7th season of collegiate ice hockey.

== Regular season ==
=== Standings ===
1900–01 Collegiate ice hockey standings
	Intercollegiate							Overall					
	GP	W	L	T	PCT.	GF	GA	GP	W	L	T	GF	GA
Brown	9	4	4	1	.500	23	39	9	4	4	1	23	39
City College of New York	–	–	–	–	–	–	–	–	–	–	–	–	–
Columbia	4	1	3	0	.250	7	21	4	1	3	0	7	21
Cornell	3	3	0	0	1.000	12	4	3	3	0	0	12	4
Harvard	3	3	0	0	1.000	14	2	3	3	0	0	14	2
Haverford	–	–	–	–	–	–	–	–	–	–	–	–	–
MIT	1	0	0	1	.500	2	2	–	–	–	–	–	–
Pennsylvania	–	–	–	–	–	–	–	–	–	–	–	–	–
Princeton	7	4	3	0	.571	28	18	13	7	6	0	50	34
Swarthmore	3	1	2	0	.333	5	13	5	2	3	0	10	19
Yale	7	5	2	0	.714	39	6	13	5	7	1	50	39

1900–01 Intercollegiate Hockey Association standings
	Conference							Overall					
	GP	W	L	T	PTS	GF	GA	GP	W	L	T	GF	GA
Brown	4	4	0	0	8	18	3	9	4	4	1	23	39
Yale *	4	3	1	0	6	25	1	13	5	7	1	50	39
Princeton	4	2	2	0	4	12	12	13	7	6	0	50	34
Columbia	4	1	3	0	2	7	21	4	1	3	0	7	21
Pennsylvania	4	0	4	0	0	7	29	–	–	–	–	–	–
* indicates conference champion
