= 1900–01 Swarthmore Garnet men's ice hockey season =

- Conference: Independent
- Home ice: West Park Ice Palace

Record
- Overall: 2–3–0
- Home: 0–2–0
- Neutral: 2–1–0

Coaches and captains
- Captain: William Clothier

The 1900–01 Swarthmore Garnet men's ice hockey season was the inaugural season of play for the program.

== Season ==
Swarthmore joined fellow Philadelphia college, Penn on the ice after the Quakers allowed the Garnet to use the West Park Ice Palace for practices and games. The team was led by tennis star William Clothier and won its first game against the Bala Cricket Club on January 5. Though two losses followed, including a rematch with Bala, the team was able to claim the city championship when it defeated Penn in mid-February. The team ended its largely successful season with a loss to Cornell at the end of the month.

While there was enough support for the program to continue, the West Park Ice Palace burned down after the season. Without a nearby rink, the team would have been forced to travel to New York City to play games and the athletic department could not afford those travel costs. The hockey team was mothballed afterwards and remains dormant more than 120 years later.

The team did not have a head coach but Nathan H. Mannakee served as team manager.

== Roster ==
No.	Nat.	Player	Class	Pos	Height	Weight	DoB	Hometown	Previous team
	(United States)	William J. Clothier (C)	Sophomore	R			1881-09-27	Sharon Hill, Pennsylvania
	(United States)	Laurence Flitcraft	Freshman	D				Oak Park, Illinois
	(United States)	Albert P. Hall	Junior	LW				Westchester, Pennsylvania
	(United States)	Eldon S. Harris	Junior	G				Philadelphia, Pennsylvania
	(United States)	T. Stockton Matthews	Junior	C				Baltimore, Maryland
	(United States)	Allen R. Mitchell Jr.	Junior					Langhorne, Pennsylvania
	(United States)	Marriott Price	Sophomore	RW			1882-06-07	Baltimore, Maryland
	(United States)	Samuel Sinclair Jr.	Freshman	D				Kennett Square, Pennsylvania
	(United States)	Robert H. Walker	Junior					Baltimore, Maryland
	(United States)	F. Barnard Welsh	Freshman	D			1880-10-23	Rockville, Maryland

== Standings ==
1900–01 Collegiate ice hockey standings
	Intercollegiate							Overall					
	GP	W	L	T	PCT.	GF	GA	GP	W	L	T	GF	GA
Brown	9	4	4	1	.500	23	39	9	4	4	1	23	39
City College of New York	–	–	–	–	–	–	–	–	–	–	–	–	–
Columbia	4	1	3	0	.250	7	21	4	1	3	0	7	21
Cornell	3	3	0	0	1.000	12	4	3	3	0	0	12	4
Harvard	3	3	0	0	1.000	14	2	3	3	0	0	14	2
Haverford	–	–	–	–	–	–	–	–	–	–	–	–	–
MIT	1	0	0	1	.500	2	2	–	–	–	–	–	–
Pennsylvania	–	–	–	–	–	–	–	–	–	–	–	–	–
Princeton	7	4	3	0	.571	28	18	13	7	6	0	50	34
Swarthmore	3	1	2	0	.333	5	13	5	2	3	0	10	19
Yale	7	5	2	0	.714	39	6	13	5	7	1	50	39

== Schedule and results ==
Date	Opponent	Site	Result	Record
Regular Season
January 5	vs. Bala Cricket Club*	West Park Ice Palace • Philadelphia, Pennsylvania	W 5–0	1–0–0
January 16	Princeton*	West Park Ice Palace • Philadelphia, Pennsylvania	L 0–7	1–1–0
February 4	vs. Bala Cricket Club*	West Park Ice Palace • Philadelphia, Pennsylvania	L 0–6	1–2–0
February 12	vs. Pennsylvania*	West Park Ice Palace • Philadelphia, Pennsylvania	W 4–2	2–2–0
February 28	Cornell*	West Park Ice Palace • Philadelphia, Pennsylvania	L 1–4	2–3–0
*Non-conference game.
