= 1898–99 Harvard Crimson men's ice hockey season =

College ice hockey season

- Conference: Independent

Record
- Overall: 0–1–0
- Road: 0–1–0

Coaches and captains
- Captain: William Beardsell

The 1898–99 Harvard Crimson men's ice hockey season was the second season of play for the program.

== Season ==
Despite scheduling several games, Harvard was only able to play one official match. They also played a few exhibition games against class club teams. This was the only losing season for Harvard until 1923–24.

== Roster ==
| No. | Nat. | Player | Class | Pos | Height | Weight | DoB | Hometown | Previous team |
|---|---|---|---|---|---|---|---|---|---|
| | (United States) | William Beardsell (C) | Junior | F |
| | | E. K. Bowser | | D |
| | (United States) | George W. Canterbury | Sophomore | F | | | 1878-02-25 | Boston, Massachusetts |
| | (United States) | Frederick Goodridge | Graduate | F | | | 1873-10-26 | Cambridge, Massachusetts |
| | (United States) | Issac Hoxie | Sophomore | F | | | 1879-01-02 | Roxbury, Massachusetts |
| | (United States) | William Laverack | Sophomore | F | | | 1879-05-31 | Lewiston, New York |
| | | Fred Russell | Senior | G | | | 1877-03-16 |
| | (United States) | Wynant Vanderpool | Graduate | D | | | 1875-08-15 | Newark, New Jersey |

== Standings ==
1898–99 Collegiate ice hockey standings
| | Intercollegiate | | | | | | | Overall | | | | | |
| | GP | W | L | T | PCT. | GF | GA | GP | W | L | T | GF | GA |
|---|---|---|---|---|---|---|---|---|---|---|---|---|---|
| Brown | 4 | 2 | 2 | 0 | .500 | 9 | 8 | 5 | 3 | 2 | 0 | 13 | 9 |
| Columbia | 3 | 0 | 3 | 0 | .000 | 2 | 7 | 5 | 2 | 3 | 0 | | |
| Harvard | 1 | 0 | 1 | 0 | .000 | 1 | 2 | 1 | 0 | 1 | 0 | 1 | 2 |
| Pennsylvania | – | – | – | – | – | – | – | – | – | – | – | – | – |
| Western University of Pennsylvania | – | – | – | – | – | – | – | – | – | – | – | – | – |
| Yale | 5 | 5 | 0 | 0 | 1.000 | 17 | 8 | 6 | 6 | 0 | 0 | 21 | 8 |

== Schedule and results ==
| Date | Opponent | Site | Result | Record |
Regular Season
| February 1 | at Brown* | Aldrich Field Rink • Providence, Rhode Island | L 1–2 | 0–1–0 |
*Non-conference game.
