= 1900–01 MIT Engineers men's ice hockey season =

- Conference: Independent

Record
- Overall: 0–0–1
- Road: 0–0–1

Coaches and captains
- Captain: Francis Smith

The 1900–01 MIT Engineers men's ice hockey season was the 3rd season of play for the program.

== Season ==
MIT scheduled several games for the season, however, many were postponed or cancelled. Some of the university's records about this season are missing as the school yearbook skips from the 1900 season to the 1902 season. The record of only one game appears in the university newspaper and while it does mention a few others, there's no evidence that any more games were played.

The team did not have a head coach but Roger Burr served as team manager and president.

Note: Massachusetts Institute of Technology athletics were referred to as 'Engineers' or 'Techmen' during the first two decades of the 20th century. By 1920 all sports programs had adopted the Engineer moniker.

== Roster ==
No.	Nat.	Player	Class	Pos	Height	Weight	DoB	Hometown	Previous team
		Gleason		RW
	(United States)	Frank A. Hill	Sophomore	LW			1878-06-13	Hollis, New Hampshire
		Albert L. Magnitzky	Sophomore	C
		Arthur H. Nickerson	Sophomore	D
		Patterson		D
		Pope		G
		Reed		C
		Francis F. H. Smith (C)	Junior	F

== Standings ==
1900–01 Collegiate ice hockey standings
	Intercollegiate							Overall					
	GP	W	L	T	PCT.	GF	GA	GP	W	L	T	GF	GA
Brown	9	4	4	1	.500	23	39	9	4	4	1	23	39
City College of New York	–	–	–	–	–	–	–	–	–	–	–	–	–
Columbia	4	1	3	0	.250	7	21	4	1	3	0	7	21
Cornell	3	3	0	0	1.000	12	4	3	3	0	0	12	4
Harvard	3	3	0	0	1.000	14	2	3	3	0	0	14	2
Haverford	–	–	–	–	–	–	–	–	–	–	–	–	–
MIT	1	0	0	1	.500	2	2	–	–	–	–	–	–
Pennsylvania	–	–	–	–	–	–	–	–	–	–	–	–	–
Princeton	7	4	3	0	.571	28	18	13	7	6	0	50	34
Swarthmore	3	1	2	0	.333	5	13	5	2	3	0	10	19
Yale	7	5	2	0	.714	39	6	13	5	7	1	50	39

== Schedule and results ==
Date	Opponent	Site	Result	Record
Regular Season
February 20	at Brown*	Aldrich Field Rink • Providence, Rhode Island	T 2–2	0–0–1
*Non-conference game.
