= Quaker City Hockey Club =

- City: Philadelphia, Pennsylvania; USA
- League: American Amateur Hockey League, 1900–01
- Founded: 1897
- Home arena: West Park Ice Palace
- Colors: Maroon, White
- Captain: George Orton

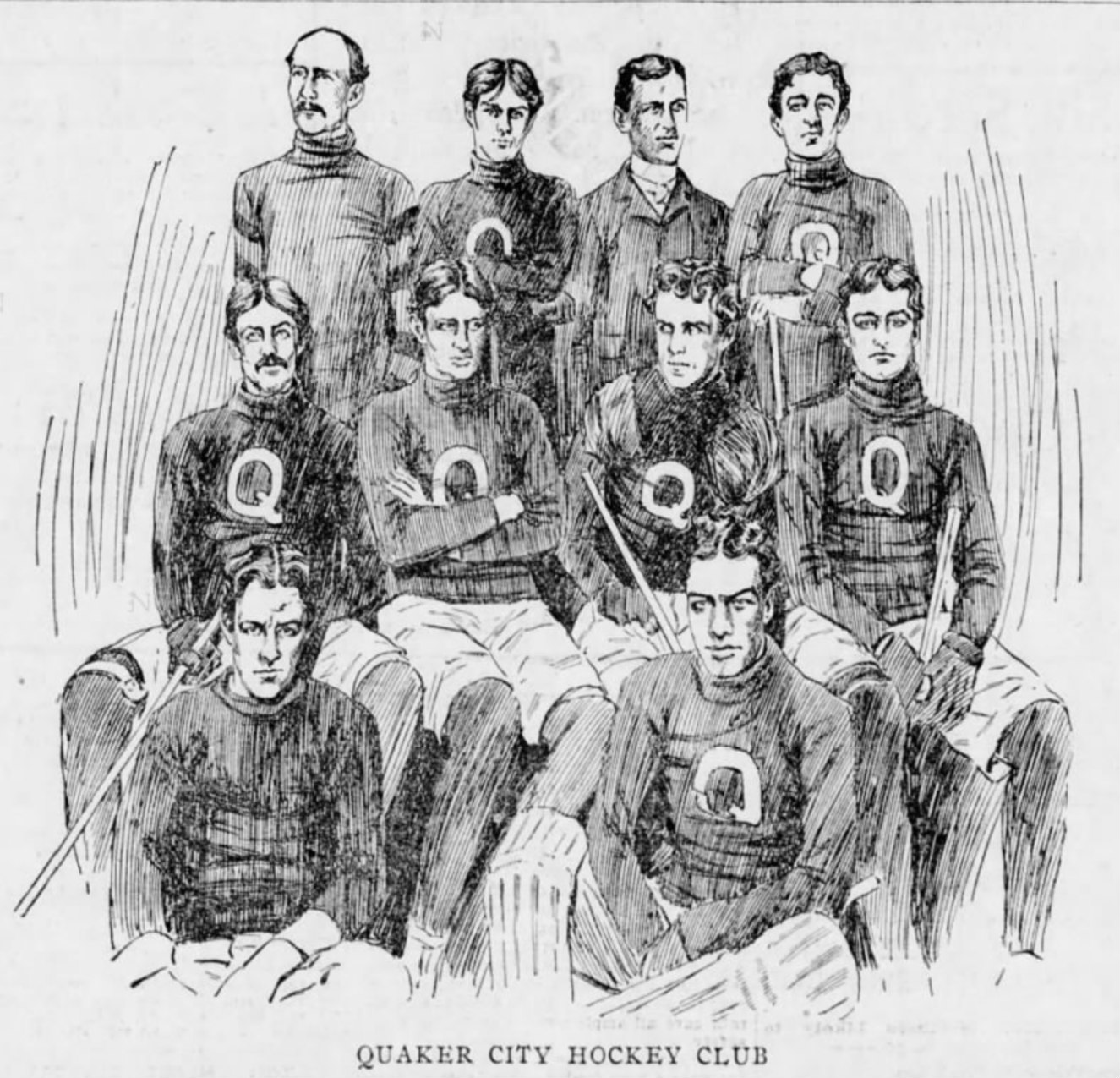
Quaker City Hockey Club, 1898–99. George Orton sits second from the right, middle row

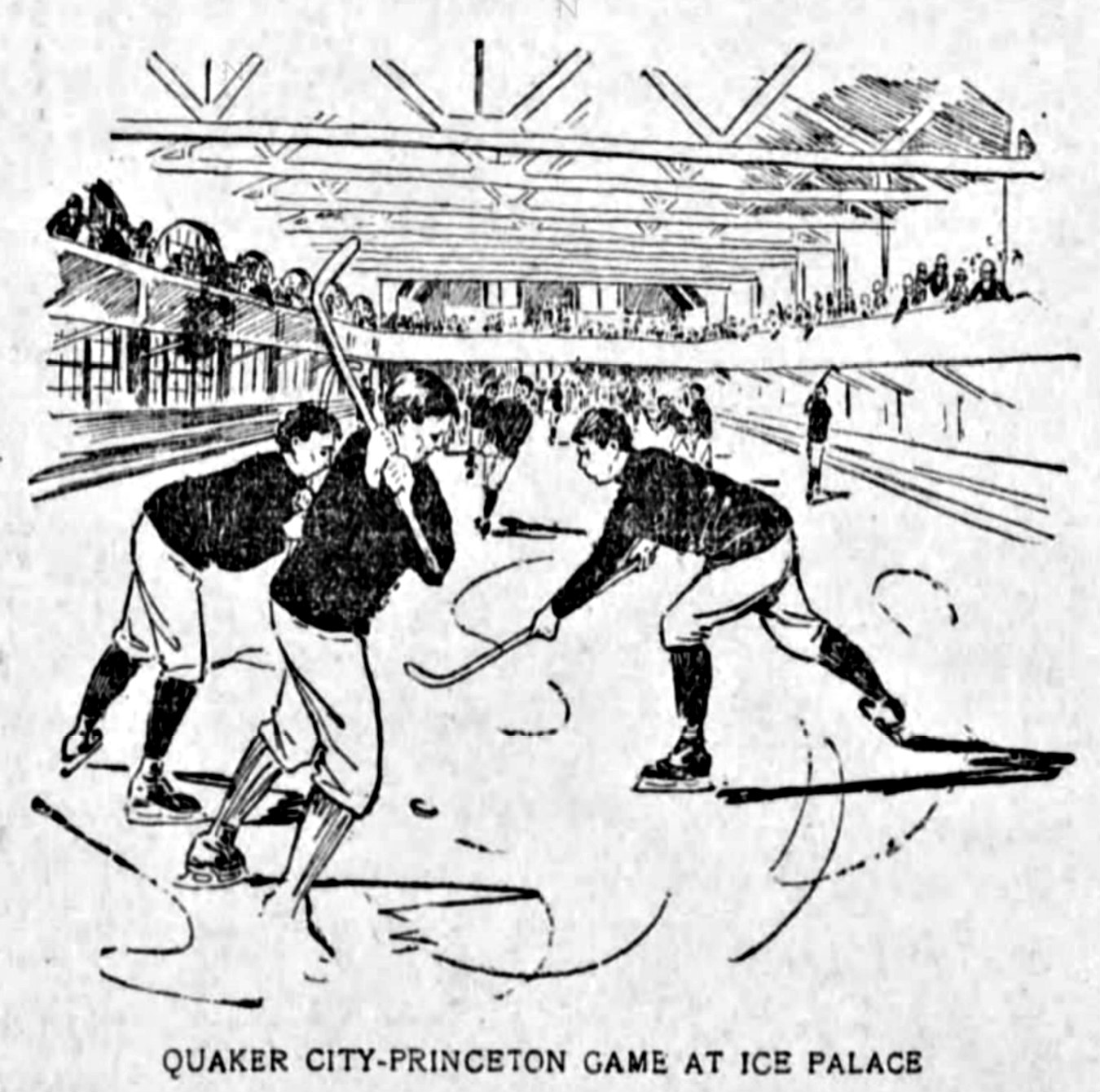
Game between Quaker City HC and Princeton University inside the West Park Ice Palace

The Quaker City Hockey Club was an amateur ice hockey team from Philadelphia, Pennsylvania.

== History ==
Formed in 1897, the Quaker City Hockey Club was a member of the American Amateur Hockey League during the 1900–01 season, playing its home games at the West Park Ice Palace at 52nd and Jefferson streets in Philadelphia before the Ice Palace was destroyed in a fire on March 24, 1901.

The team finished last in the 1900–01 AAHL standings (behind Brooklyn Crescents, New York Athletic Club, St. Nicholas Hockey Club, Brooklyn Skating Club and New York Hockey Club) with two wins, eight losses and one draw.

Canadian middle distance runner and Olympic gold medalist George Orton captained the team during its season in the AAHL. Also on the 1900–01 roster was Pennsylvania native 1906 U.S. Open tennis champion William Clothier. Stanley Willett (of the Montreal Victorias) captained and starred for Quaker City in 1897–98 and 1898–99.
