= West Park Ice Palace =

Former ice hockey and skating rink in Philadelphia (1897–1901)

- Ice Skating Palace
- Interactive map of West Park Ice Palace
- Address: 5166-5170 Jefferson Street; Philadelphia, Pennsylvania
- Coordinates: 39.979236°N 75.225140°W
- Owner: York Ice Manufacturing Company
- Operator: York Ice Manufacturing Company
- Capacity: 2,000
- Field size: 255' by 55'
- Public transit: PRR 52nd St Station

Construction
- Opened: December 14, 1897
- Closed: March 24, 1901 (fire)

Tenants
- Penn Quakers (Hockey) (1897-1901); Quaker City Hockey Club (AAHL) (1900-1901)

The West Park Ice Palace was an ice skating rink on Jefferson Street in West Philadelphia that opened in December 1897 and was destroyed by fire in March 1901. Referred to in advertisements as the Ice Skating Palace, the rink was open to the public for ice skating and local hockey clubs including the University of Pennsylvania and the Quaker City Hockey Club. The adjacent ice manufacturing plant was operated by the York Ice Manufacturing Company and supplied ice to the American Ice Company.

== Opening and Ice Skating ==
Canadian George Orton was a track-star at the University of Pennsylvania in the 1890s who would medal at the 1900 Paris Olympics. In the 1890s, Orton noted that Philadelphia, one of the largest cities in the country, did not have an indoor ice skating facility. Recreational skating and ice hockey were limited to outdoor rinks and frozen waterways and subject to the variances of weather conditions. Hockey was growing in popularity in Philadelphia, and Orton created a partnership with the West Park Ice Palace and Amusement Company to build a proper indoor skating facility.

In June 1896, it was reported that George C. Dietrich had secured a contract to erect an ice manufacturing plant at 52nd and Jefferson Streets.

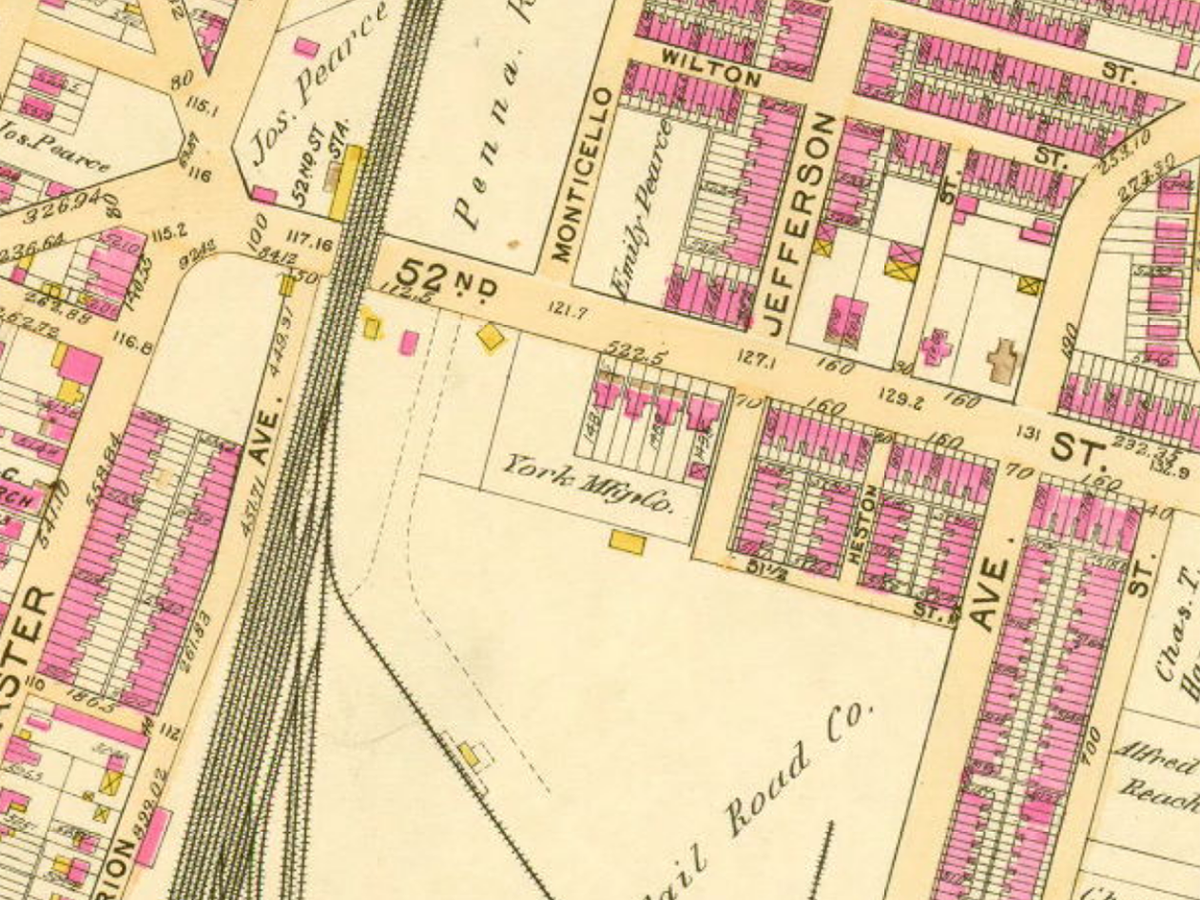
A 1901 Sanborn Map of Philadelphia shows the property owned by York Ice Manufacturing Company, which was the site of West Park Ice Palace. The rink occupied the 60 by 300 foot parcel of land extending from Jefferson toward the railroad.

The Ice Palace was built as a brick two-story building with the ice skating rink on the upper floor. It was constructed next to the clubhouse of the Y.M.C.A. on Jefferson Street, and built near the 52nd Street railroad station which was serviced by the Pennsylvania Rail Road at the time providing ready access. The Ice Palace featured an ice surface 225-feet by 55-feet with promenades, a large area in which an orchestra would play for skaters, and space to accommodate more than 2,000 spectators. The building featured a cafe, four reception rooms, a cloak room, and an amusement hall with kinetoscopes and photographs. Up to 1,500 people could skate on the ice at one time. The Ice Palace offered locker rooms with showers behind the rink to hockey teams. The Philadelphia Inquirer reported that the Ice Palace was the largest indoor skating rink in the world at the time, big enough for a twelve-lane speed skating track.

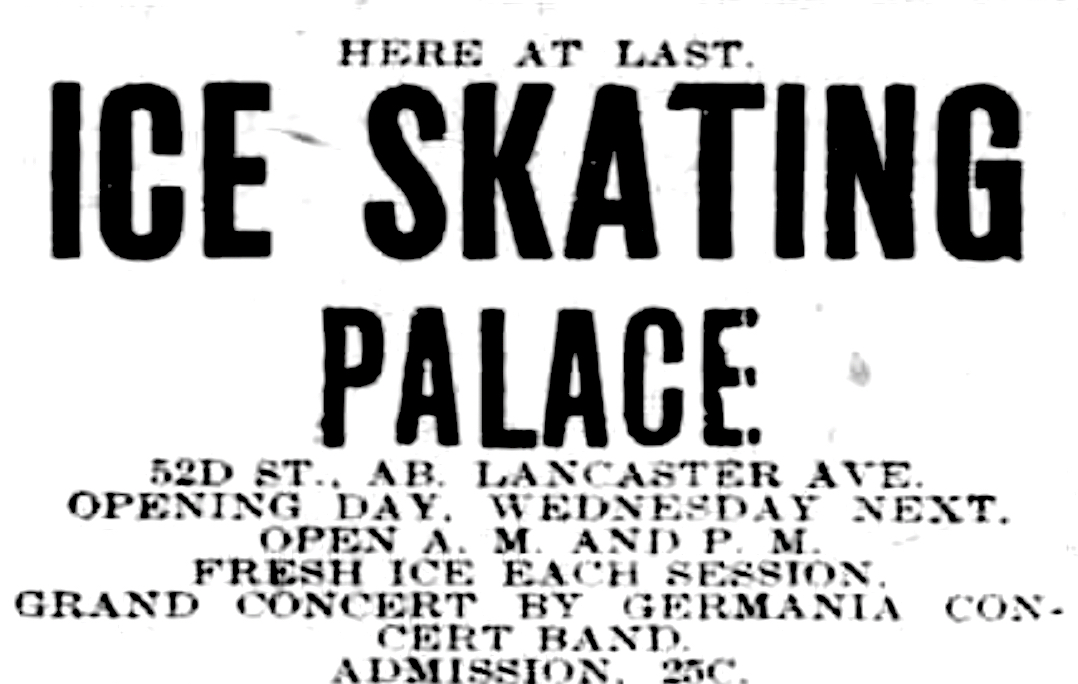
Advertisement in Philadelphia Inquirer for opening of Ice Palace (December 12, 1897)

The new building opened on December 14, 1897, in the presence of Philadelphia mayor Charles Warwick, more than 2,000 attendees, and the Germania band which entertained the crowd. Orton divided his team in two, one captained by himself and the other by Willett, which played each other in a feature exhibition that finished in a 1-0 decision. Former Philadelphia mayors Edwin Stuart and William Smith umpired the game. Following the exhibition, the ice was opened to the public for skating with more than 600 individuals on the ice.

The Ice Palace was open to the public for ice skating.

The second season opened on November 19, 1898. It was advertised that the White City Military Band would perform in the afternoon and evenings. Season tickets were $10.00 and commutation tickets, $5.00. Single admissions were twenty-five cents each. In December 1898, the Ice Palace advertised three daily sessions, at 10am, 2pm, and 8pm.

Figure skating, races, and demonstrations were presented at the Ice Palace.

In January 1898, the Ice Palace featured a three night series of competitive races between Canadian champion Joseph Donoghue and New Jersey's William Letts. Donoghue defeated Letts in a mile race on January 14, 1898. On January 18, 1898, Donoghue William Letts in a 3-mile (40-lap) race. On January 19, 1899, Orton himself presented what was billed as an exhibition of fast skating. 800 fans at the Ice Palace saw Orton beat the one mile time of 3:51.4 set by Le Roy See the previous week in New York. John F. Davidson, a premier acrobatic and trick skater of the age, appeared at the Ice Palace on February 10, 1899, where he set a new record for the high jump on ice skates clearing three feet and nine and one-half inches.

In February 1899, the amateur fancy and figure skating contest was held at the Ice Palace with twenty events presented over multiple nights.

A fire broke out on January 25, 1898, in the engine room of the Hestonville Ice Company adjoining the Ice Palace. At the time there were 200 skaters on the ice who were ushered out in a panic while the fire was extinguished by employees.

== Ice Hockey at the Ice Palace ==
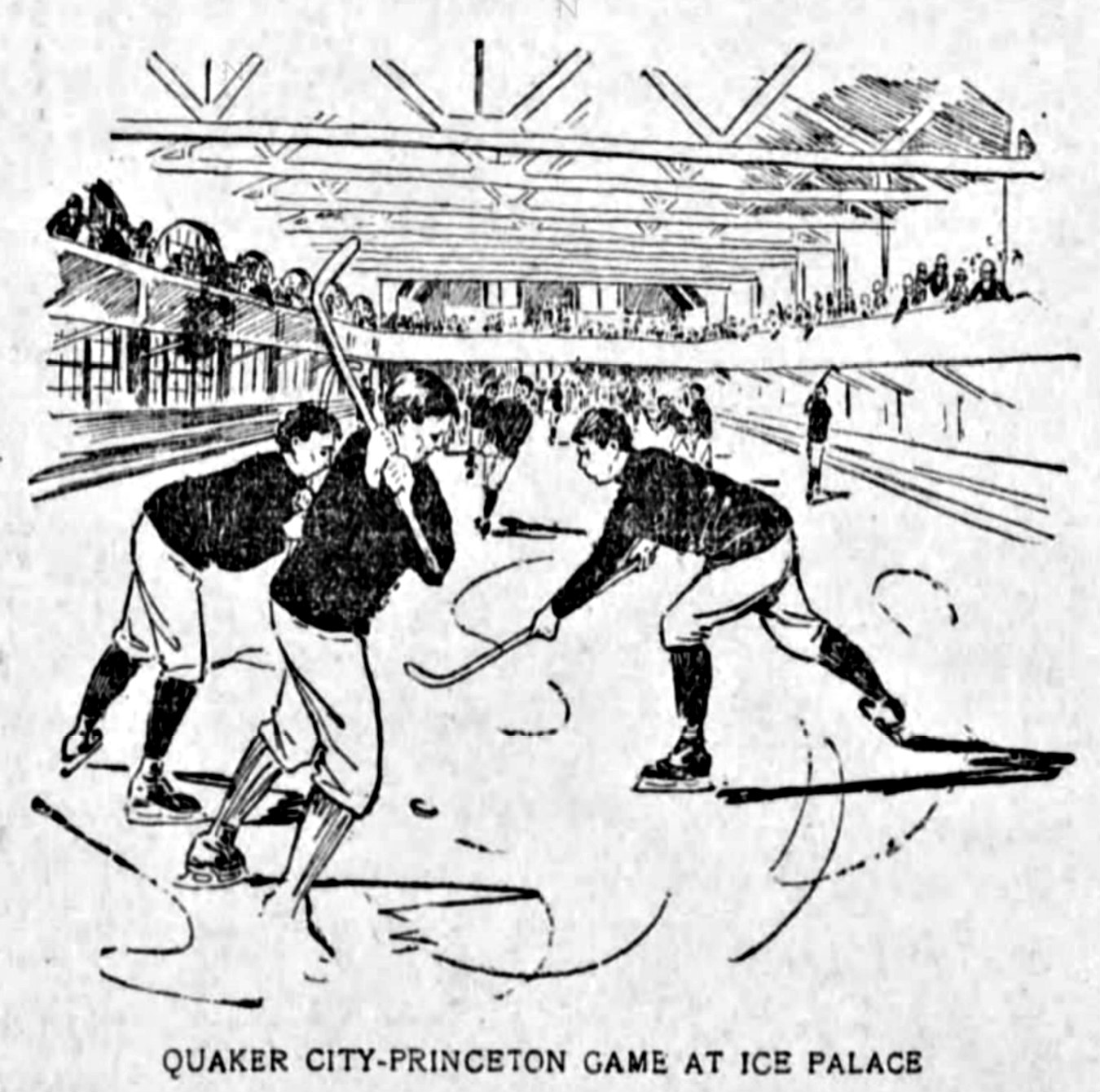
Quaker City faces Princeton University on December 12, 1900, at the West Park Ice Palace

Orton had introduced ice hockey to Penn and captained its first team in 1896–1897. Under Orton's influence, Penn became pioneers of ice hockey in the United States and among the first college hockey teams. (While official University of Pennsylvania history dates the ice hockey program to 1898, Penn fielded a competitive team in 1896–1897.) Orton would institutionalize ice hockey at Penn and in Philadelphia. With the opening of the Ice Palace in December 1897, Orton founded the American Hockey League of Philadelphia in January 1898, and the following year formed the Quaker City Hockey Club which played in the American Amateur Hockey League.

The Quaker City Hockey Club also featured Orton's fellow Canadians William Phymister and Stanley Willett both of whom had played with Orton on the 1896-1897 Penn hockey team. Phymister and Willett would later play for various Pittsburgh teams in the Western Pennsylvania Hockey League (WPHL) between 1899 and 1904.

The American Hockey League of Philadelphia formed in 1898 with four teams, the Haverford College Grammar School, Wayne School, Philadelphia Dental College, and Orton's University of Pennsylvania. Orton would simultaneously serve as league president. Haverford won the championship.

The Intercollegiate Hockey Association was formed in 1899 with four teams, Brown, Yale, Columbia, and Penn. Games were played at three rinks, the St. Nicholas Rink in Manhattan, Clermont Avenue Rink in Brooklyn, and in Philadelphia at the Ice Palace.

Games at the Ice Palace regularly featured match ups between collegiate and amateur club teams. In December 1897, the University of Maryland met the Montclair Athletic Club at the Ice Palace with Montclair winning 1–0. On December 12, 1900, Quaker City defeated the Princeton University team 6–0. Swarthmore used the West Park Ice Palace for practices and games. The Princeton and Cornell hockey teams first met on Saturday, March 2, 1901, at the Ice Palace. Cornell won the game 4–2, and ended its first season with a perfect 3–0 record.

== Burning (1901) ==
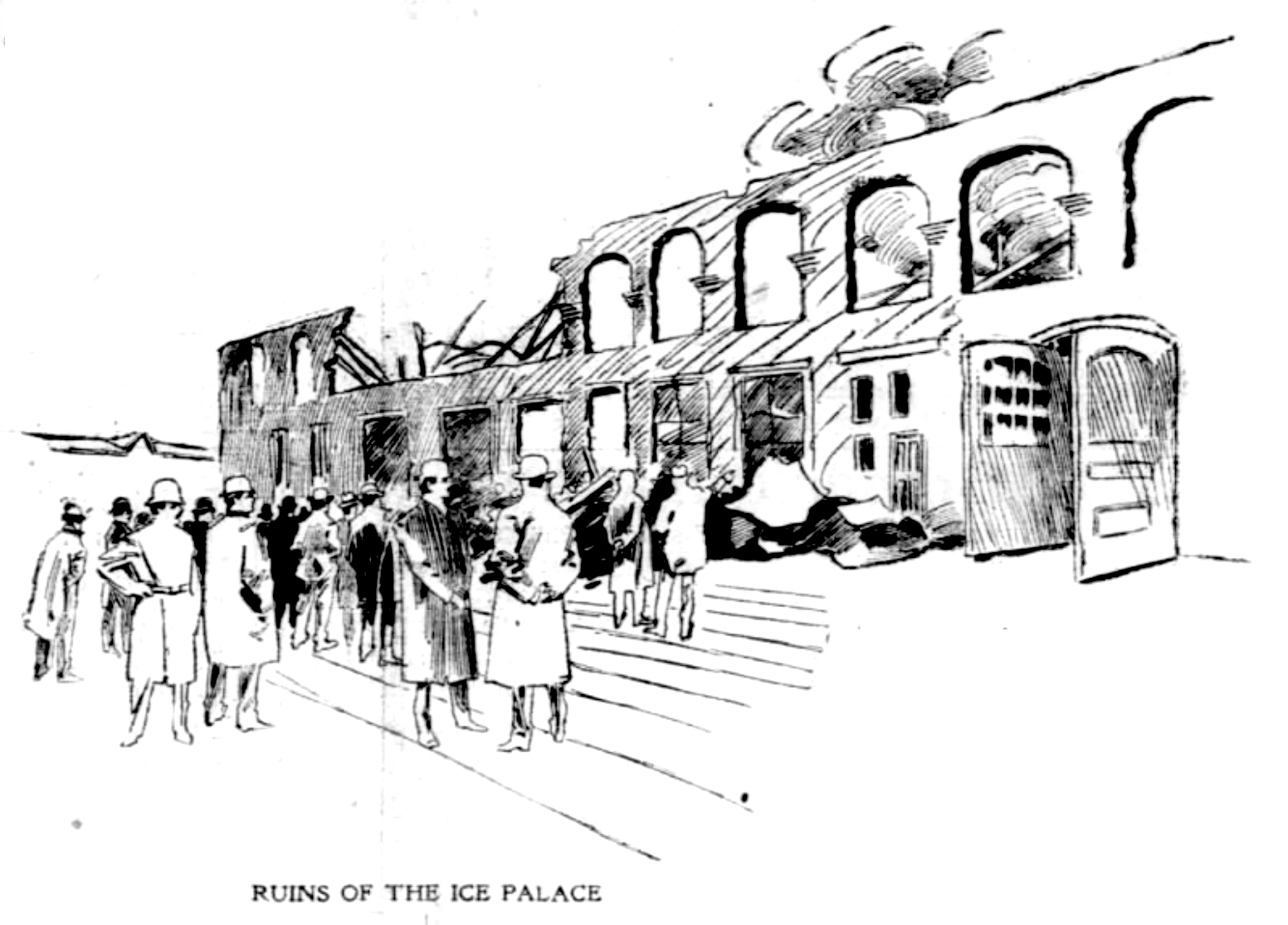
"Ruins of the Ice Palace", March 25, 1901, Philadelphia Inquirer

On March 24, 1901, a little after 3am, the building was found to have caught fire, destroying the second floor before the first fire engine arrived. The Shetland pony, kept at the facility in the engine room, and used to plane off the ice (prior to the invention and introduction of the zamboni) was trapped and burned to death. It was speculated that a discarded cigar from the Saturday night crowd of ice skaters might have ignited the blaze. Only one wall was left standing and it was soon demolished to protect the Y.M.C.A. building which stood next door.

In addition to the loss of the skating rink for recreation and hockey, the York Ice Manufacturing Company lost its ice making capabilities in the fire and would be unable to fulfill its contract to supply the American Ice Company. Thousands of pounds of stored ice for commercial distribution were lost in the destruction of the building and machinery. York Ice Manufacturing had ordered and were scheduled to install $40,000 in new machinery the following day. While the fire obviated their ability to use the new machinery, it had not yet been delivered and would not be lost in the fire. In the final calculation, the loss of the building was valued at $100,000.

The loss of the Ice Palace left Philadelphia without an indoor skating rink, and proved a set back to the development of ice hockey in the city including the shuttering of Penn's ice hockey program. Following World War I, Orton revived Penn's hockey club, and lobbied Philadelphia's business and political leaders for the construction of a new indoor facility. The Philadelphia Auditorium and Ice Palace would open in 1920 at 45th and Market Streets, and immediately serve as the home ice for collegiate, amateur, and later professional ice hockey in Philadelphia.
