= Columbia Lions men's ice hockey =

- University: Columbia University
- Conference: Empire
- Head coach: Jonathan de Castro
- Arena: World Ice Arena; New York City
- Colors: Columbia blue and white

The Columbia Lions men's ice hockey is an ice hockey team club in New York City, associated with Columbia University since its establishment in 1896. It went dormant following its 1937 season, but was eventually revived as a club team. It remains active in the 2020s.

== History ==
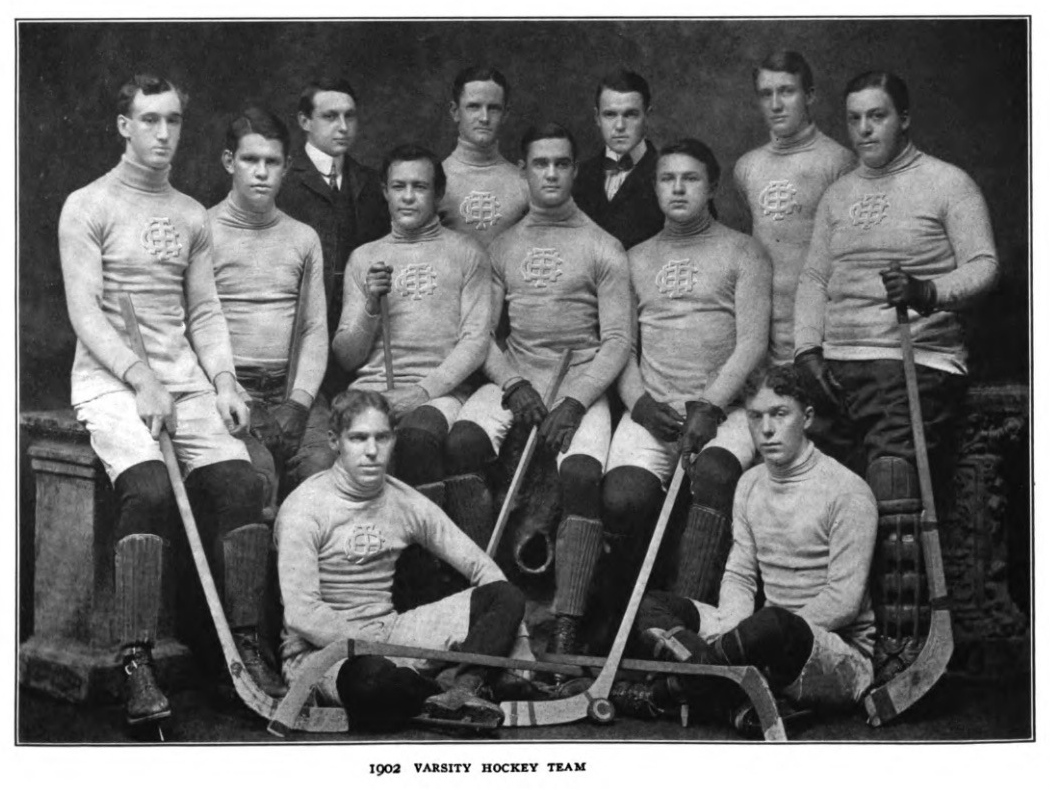
1902 Varsity ice hockey team

Columbia was one of the first colleges in the United States to play ice hockey. The team benefitted from being virtually next door to the St. Nicholas Rink, one of the earliest artificial ice rinks in the country. Columbia played continually from 1896 through 1915, routinely competing against the best programs in the nation. They brought in experienced players to help improve the team like Tom Howard and Percy LeSueur but a disagreement between college administrations dealt a mortal wound to the program.

Early in the 20th century, the NCAA's precursor was formed to set down rules that all schools would abide by. At the time Ice Hockey was not governed by a national body (the NCAA would ignore the sport until after World War II) which left the few schools that fielded teams able to decide the rules for themselves. The major competitors, the teams that would later form the Ivy league, decided that they would prohibit freshmen from participating and limit players to 3 years of varsity play. Of the schools that were members of the Intercollegiate Hockey Association, only Columbia did not agree to the rules. As a result, the Lions were expelled from the IHA. The team's removal then caused the operators of the St. Nicholas Rink to close their door on the team, putting the program in dire straits in the middle of the 1912–13 season. While the IHA would collapse entirely after the season, Columbia had not been a big draw to the Rink over the previous few seasons and the St. Nicholas operators were hesitant to give the Lions any additional ice time. After playing an entire season on the road, Columbia managed to get a 'test' game at the Rink in order to prove that the ice hockey team was enough of an attraction. The Lions played what was described as an exciting game, but the audience was too small and the team was forced to find another home.

Columbia struggled for several years, battling poor weather conditions and a lack of facilities. but were unable to play a single game between 1915 and 1921. The team finally returned when they were able to secure the 181st Street Ice Palace as a home. The rink was mostly used for speed skating and was smaller than most ice hockey rinks of the time. The team played well in spite of their circumstances but, just three years later, they were forced to halt playing once again. The team remained dormant for most of the next decade but was revived in the mid-1930s. By that time the administration was no longer prepared to support the team and the Lions were compelled to perform as a club team and played under that distinction for three years. In 1937 the school decided to sponsor the program again and Columbia played a schedule composed mostly of amateur clubs but did perform well at times. After the season the two players responsible for resurrecting the team, Chris McFadden and Jack McMahon, both graduated. Without their presence, or a head coach to keep the team alive, the program was allowed to wither away and vanish.

Several years later the team resurfaced as a club team once more but the university had not made any plans to promote the program to varsity status (as of 2022). In the 2021–2022 season, the Columbia Lions defeated Sacred Heart 9–3 to win the MCHC Championship. The club departed from the American Collegiate Hockey Association and was promoted to Division II status under the Amateur Athletic Union for the 2023–24 season, where it would compete in the Empire Collegiate Hockey Conference.

== Season-by-season results ==
NCAA D-I Champions	NCAA Frozen Four	Conference Regular Season Champions	Conference Playoff Champions

Season	Conference	Regular Season (Note: Code explanation; GP—Games Played, W—Wins, L—Losses, T—Tied games, Pts—Points*)											Conference Tournament Results	National Tournament Results
Season	Conference	Conference						Overall					Conference Tournament Results	National Tournament Results
Season	Conference	GP	W	L	T	Pts*	Finish	GP	W	L	T	%	Conference Tournament Results	National Tournament Results
No coach
1896–97	Independent	–	–	–	–	–	–	5	2	3	0	.400		
1897–98	IHA	4	0	3	1	.125	3rd	13	3	8	2	.308		
1898–99	IHA	3	0	3	0	.000	4th	5	2	3	0	.400		
1899–1900 ^{¿}	IHA	5	3	2	0	.600	2nd	5	3	2	0	.600		
1900–01	IHA	4	1	3	0	.250	4th	4	1	3	0	.250		
1901–02	IHA	4	0	4	0	.000	5th	8	2	4	2	.375		
1902–03	IHA	4	2	2	0	.500	3rd	9	3	5	1	.389		
1903–04	IHA	4	2	2	0	.500	3rd	12	5	6	1	.458		
1904–05	IHA	4	2	2	0	.500	3rd	8	4	4	0	.500		
Rudolph von Bernuth (1905–1906)
1905–06	IHA	4	2	2	0	.500	3rd	12	4	7	1	.375		
J. C. Coolican (1906–1907)
1906–07	IHA	4	0	4	0	.000	5th	5	0	5	0	.000		
Rudolph von Bernuth (1907–1910)
1907–08	IHA	4	1	3	0	.250	T–3rd	5	1	4	0	.200		
1908–09	IHA	4	0	4	0	.000	5th	5	1	4	0	.200		
1909–10	IHA	5	0	5	0	.000	6th	7	1	5	1	.214		
Percy LeSueur (1910–1911)
1910–11	IHA	5	2	3	0	.400	T–3rd	7	4	3	0	.571		
Tom Howard (1911–1913)
1911–12	IHA	4	3	1	0	.750	2nd	4	3	1	0	.750		
1912–13	Independent	–	–	–	–	–	–	2	0	2	0	.000		
Rudolph von Bernuth / Rufus Trimble (1913–1915)
1913–14	Independent	–	–	–	–	–	–	5	1	4	0	.200		
1914–15	Independent	–	–	–	–	–	–	5	2	3	0	.400		
Program suspended due to lack of ice
Harrison (1920–1921)
1920–21	Independent	–	–	–	–	–	–	5	1	4	0	.200		
Tom Howard (1921–1923)
1921–22	Independent	–	–	–	–	–	–	7	3	3	1	.500		
1922–23	Independent	–	–	–	–	–	–	6	3	3	0	.500		
Program suspended due to lack of ice
No coach
1937–38	Independent	–	–	–	–	–	–	11	2	8	1	.227		
Program suspended
Totals								GP	W	L	T	%	Championships	
Regular Season								155	54	91	10	.381		
Conference Post-season								0	0	0	0	–		
NCAA Post-season								0	0	0	0	–		
Regular Season and Post-season Record								155	54	91	10	.381		

* Winning percentage is used when conference schedules are unbalanced.
¿ Information on the 1899–1900 season is incomplete.
