= Intercollegiate Hockey Association =

American ice hockey league, 1898 to 1913

- Founded: 1898
- Folded: 1913
- Sports fielded: Ice hockey
- No. of teams: Between 3 and 6
- Region: Northeastern United States

The Intercollegiate Hockey Association was a loose collection of ice hockey programs from schools in the Northeastern United States. Each college involved would play every other team at least once during the season, and the team with the best record would be declared the champion. As this was the only championship for college hockey at the time, the victor served as the de facto National Champion. The IHA was called both the Intercollegiate Hockey Association and the Intercollegiate Hockey League during its existence. It is referred to here as the IHA to distinguish from the later Intercollegiate Hockey League. Although all of the IHA member colleges later became members of the Ivy League, there was never a time when they were all in the IHA at once.

== History ==
The IHA began in February 1898 while the season was in progress. Brown, Columbia, University of Pennsylvania, and Yale agreed to form the league after some of their intercollegiate games had already been played. However, all of the matches played that season were counted for the inaugural championship (even those played prior to the founding of the IHA). Brown was the initial victor, finishing with an undefeated record against the other three teams.

The 1899 season featured the same four teams. All of the games were played at three rinks, the St. Nicholas Rink in Manhattan, Clermont Avenue Rink in Brooklyn, and in Philadelphia at the West Park Ice Palace.

After the first full season of play, the league started holding a championship series at the end of the season for the two best teams. Yale won the first three series. The series was eventually reduced to a single game before being abandoned altogether after 1904. In the 1904–05 season, the league champion returned to being the team with the best record against IHA opponents.

The IHA expanded to include other future Ivy League schools like Harvard and Princeton, then welcomed Dartmouth after Brown suspended its program in 1906. At the same meeting where Dartmouth was admitted, the committee also banned freshmen from participating on varsity teams. Cornell joined the league a few years later.

In 1911, restrictions imposed by Harvard faculty forced the college to resign from the league. The following year, both Columbia and Yale left, dropping membership back to just three teams. The league continued until the end of the year before disbanding.

== Members ==
Locations of member teams

Institution	Nickname	Location	Founded	Tenure	Fate	Current conference
Brown University	Bears	Providence, Rhode Island	1764	1898–1906	Program Suspended	ECAC Hockey
Columbia University	Lions	New York, New York	1754	1898–1912	Independent	Program Suspended
Cornell University	Big Red	Ithaca, New York	1865	1909–1913	Independent	ECAC Hockey
Dartmouth College	none †	Hanover, New Hampshire	1769	1906–1913	Independent	ECAC Hockey
Harvard University	Crimson	Boston, Massachusetts	1636	1901–1911	Independent	ECAC Hockey
University of Pennsylvania	Quakers	Philadelphia, Pennsylvania	1740	1898–1899, 1900–1901	Program Suspended	
Princeton University	Tigers	Princeton, New Jersey	1746	1900–1913	Intercollegiate Hockey League	ECAC Hockey
Yale University	Bulldogs	New Haven, Connecticut	1701	1898–1912	Intercollegiate Hockey League	ECAC Hockey

† Dartmouth's athletic teams did not possess a moniker until the 1920s.

== See also ==
- Intercollegiate Hockey League
- Pentagonal League
