= St. Nicholas Rink =

Former arena in Manhattan, New York

- "The Rink"
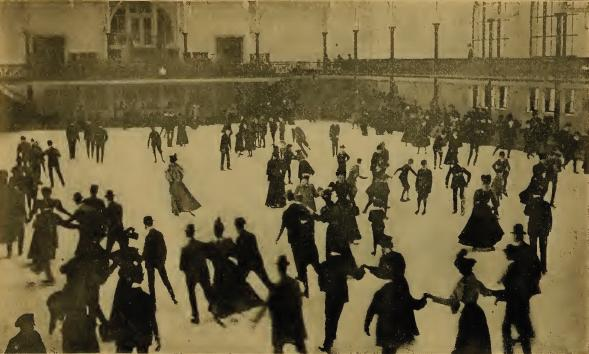
- 1901 pleasure skating

- Location within New York City
- Address: 69 West 66th Street
- Location: Manhattan, New York City, U.S.
- Coordinates: 40°46′23.68″N 73°58′49.32″W
- Type: Ice hockey arena; Boxing arena
- Surface: Artificial ice

Construction
- Opened: November 7, 1896
- Closed: May 28, 1962

The St. Nicholas Rink, also called the St. Nicholas Arena, was an indoor ice rink, and later a boxing arena in New York City from 1896 until 1962. The rink was one of the earliest indoor ice rinks made of mechanically frozen ice in North America (others included the North Avenue Ice Palace in Baltimore and the Ice Palace in New York, both opened in 1894), enabling a longer season for skating sports. It was demolished in the 1980s.

As a rink, it was used for pleasure skating, and the sports of ice hockey and skating. It was an important rink in the development of both sports in the United States. As a boxing arena, it was one of the first legal venues for boxing and remained a busy venue until its closing, although as the popularity of boxing grew, the sport outgrew the capacity of the arena to hold title fights. The arena hosted live boxing on television.

== History ==
St. Nicholas Rink opened November 7, 1896, at 69 West 66th Street, on the northeast corner of 66th Street and Columbus Avenue. The builders included Cornelius Vanderbilt and John Jacob Astor. Flagg and Chambers were the architects. Before the construction of the building, the St. Nicholas Skating Club had been using an outdoor flooded lot.

The ice rink used a mechanically frozen ice or "artificial ice" surface using techniques developed at the Glaciarium in London, England. A basement ice-making factory shared the ice-making equipment. Another New York skating venue, the Ice Palace, opened shortly before the St. Nicholas Arena. A third artificial ice rink, the Clermont Avenue Rink in Brooklyn opened in 1896, to provide three artificial ice rinks in New York City.

The arena was used exclusively for ice sports until 1906, when boxing was introduced. In 1911, prize fight boxing was legalized and prize fights became a popular event at the arena. By 1920, the use of the arena for boxing made the ice rink dispensable and it was removed. The building continued as a boxing venue until 1962. The building itself was used as a television production center for the ABC Network and local station WABC-TV where Eyewitness News was broadcast. The building was demolished in the 1980s and the site converted to main offices of ABC Network.

During the World War II era, the building was briefly named Royal Windsor Palace.

== Ice hockey ==
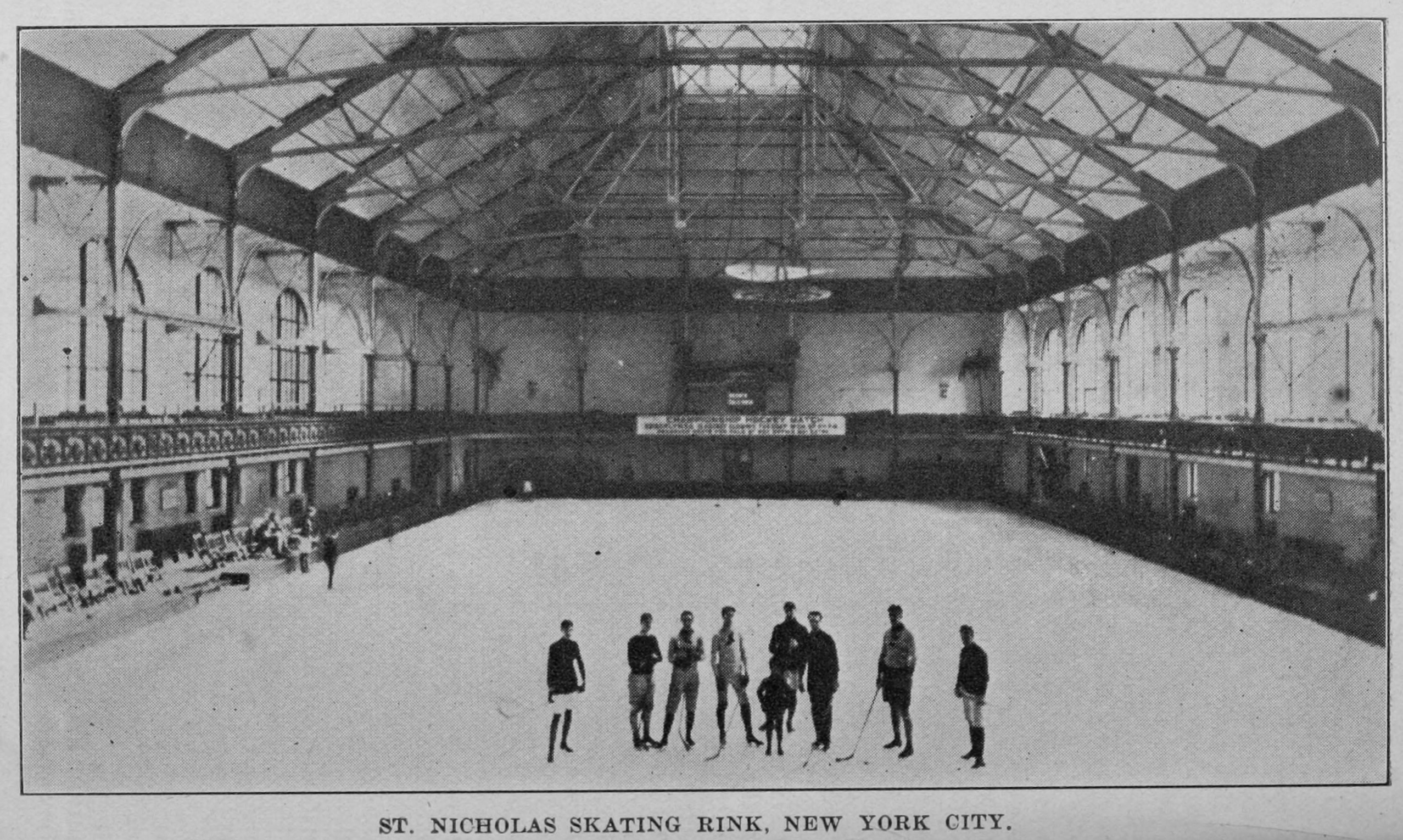
A group of ice hockey players on the St. Nicholas Rink.

The rink was the home of the St. Nicholas Hockey Club of the American Amateur Hockey League. The league operated its first season in 1896–97. The rink was also the site of numerous exhibitions of Canadian ice hockey teams both against New York area teams and between the Canadian teams. A challenge between amateur teams of the U.S. and Canada was held there, called the "International Amateur Championship".

On February 26, 1900, the rink was the site of the first ice hockey game between Harvard University and Yale University, won by Yale 5–4.

The arena was the site of the first game between women's ice hockey teams in the United States. In 1917, the St. Nicholas team defeated Boston 1–0.

The St. Nicholas men's amateur team eventually moved to Madison Square Garden and played on Sunday afternoons in the Eastern Amateur Hockey League.

== Boxing ==
The Rink was a boxing venue from 1906 until May 28, 1962. 30,000 fights were reportedly staged here. (Other estimates have a range of 10,000 to 20,000.) Accounts in The New York Times report that boxing greats Jack Johnson, Jess Willard, Kid Chocolate and Rocky Graziano fought there; the future heavyweight champion Floyd Patterson fought his first professional match there in 1952. On one of the final fight cards, Cassius Clay (later Muhammad Ali) stopped Billy Daniels by seventh-round TKO on May 19, 1962, nine days before The Rink closed its doors for good. The last broadcast on the DuMont Television Network was a match aired as part of the Boxing from St. Nicholas Arena program on August 6, 1956. (Note: Journalist Steve Tober writes that DuMont syndicated a Thanksgiving game of high school football in 1957.)

In a 1960 episode called "The Big Tall Wish" of the American television anthology series The Twilight Zone the venue of a fictional boxing match was a "St. Nick's Arena". The arena is also a location in the episode "A Death of Princes" from the American television series Naked City which originally aired on 12 October 1960. Guest stars include Eli Wallach, George Maharis, Peter Falk, and Godfrey Cambridge.

== Other sports ==
The arena was also formative in the growing sport of figure skating. Championships were held at the rink starting in 1897. The last championship, a "North American Championship" was held in 1918.

St. Nicholas Arena was also a venue for wrestling.

== See also ==
- Glaciarium
