= 1904–05 Army Cadets men's ice hockey season =

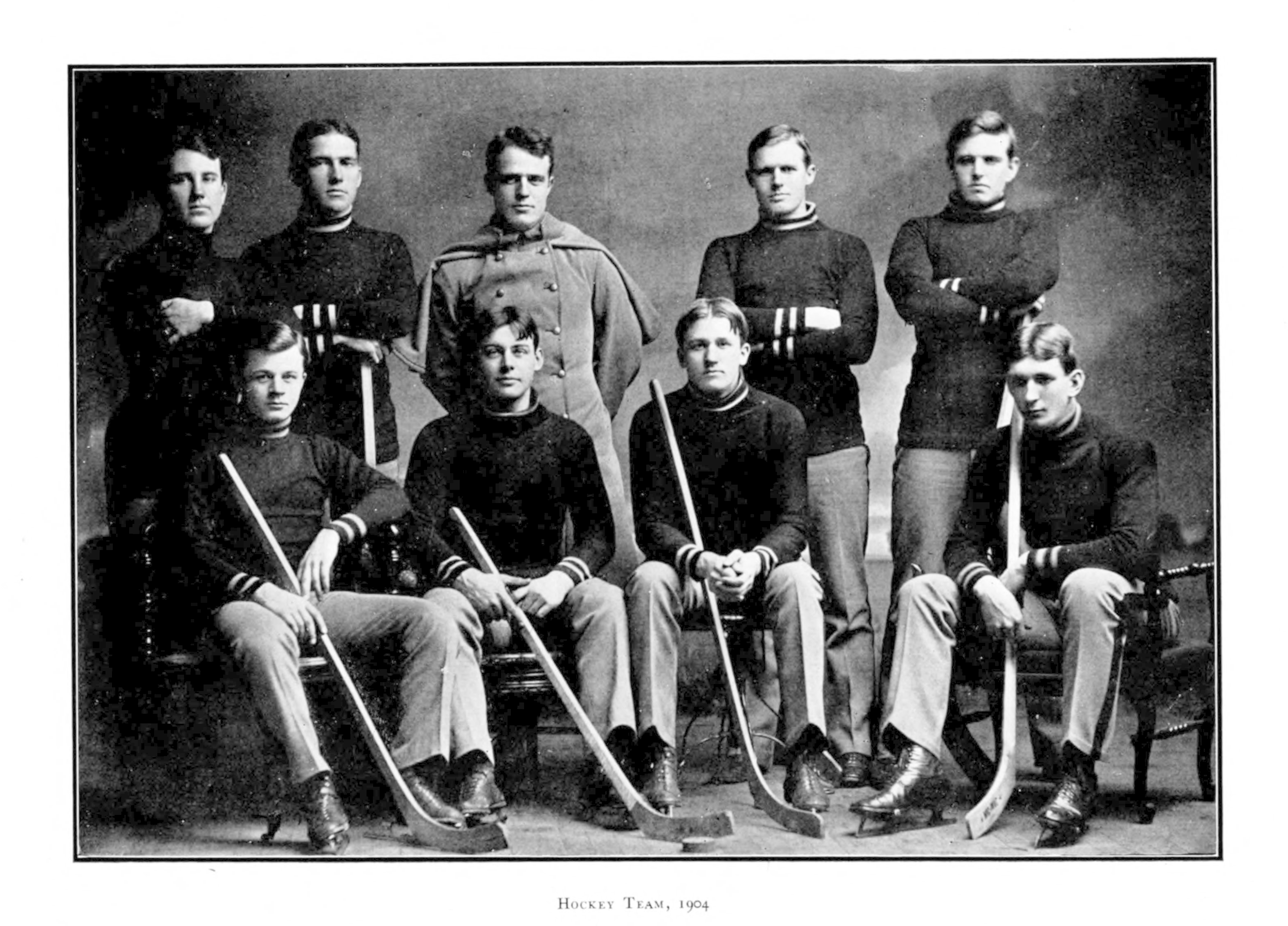
- Conference: Independent
- Home ice: Lusk Reservoir

Record
- Overall: 7–1–0

Coaches and captains
- Head coach: Robert Foy
- Captain: LeRoy Bartlett

The 1904–05 Army Cadets men's ice hockey season was the 2nd season of play for the program.

== Season ==
In Army's second season the team played its first intercollegiate game, albeit against a very short-lived team.

== Roster ==
No.	Nat.	Player	Class	Pos	Height	Weight	DoB	Hometown	Previous team
		LeRoy Bartlett (C)					1880-12-17

== Standings ==
1904–05 Collegiate ice hockey standings
	Intercollegiate							Overall					
	GP	W	L	T	PCT.	GF	GA	GP	W	L	T	GF	GA
Army	1	1	0	0	1.000	6	2	8	7	1	0	23	7
Brown	4	0	4	0	.000	3	35	5	0	5	0	5	38
Columbia	4	2	2	0	.500	9	17	8	4	4	0	23	39
Harvard	6	6	0	0	1.000	65	9	10	10	0	0	97	16
MIT	2	0	2	0	.000	2	32	9	6	3	0	60	46
Polytechnic Institute of Brooklyn	–	–	–	–	–	–	–	–	–	–	–	–	–
Princeton	4	1	3	0	.250	15	18	6	1	4	1	15	32
Springfield Training	–	–	–	–	–	–	–	–	–	–	–	–	–
Yale	4	3	1	0	.750	30	14	9	5	4	0	37	29

== Schedule and results ==
Date	Opponent	Site	Result	Record
Regular Season
	Newburgh Alumni*	Lusk Reservoir • West Point, New York	W 3–0	1–0–0
	Newburgh Free Academy*	Lusk Reservoir • West Point, New York	W 4–0	2–0–0
	Polytechnic Institute of Brooklyn	Lusk Reservoir • West Point, New York	W 6–2	3–0–0 (1–0–0)
	St. Paul's School*	Lusk Reservoir • West Point, New York	L 1–2	3–1–0
	Riverview Military Academy*	Lusk Reservoir • West Point, New York	W 2–0	4–1–0
	Mohegan Lake School*	Lusk Reservoir • West Point, New York	W 2–1	5–1–0
	Essex Troop, NJNG*	Lusk Reservoir • West Point, New York	W 2–0	6–1–0
	Mohegan Lake School*	Lusk Reservoir • West Point, New York	W 3–2	7–1–0
*Non-conference game.
