= 1909–10 MIT Engineers men's ice hockey season =

- Conference: Independent

Record
- Overall: 4–4–0
- Road: 2–3–0
- Neutral: 2–1–0

Coaches and captains
- Captain: William O'Hearn

The 1909–10 MIT Engineers men's ice hockey season was the 11th season of play for the program.

== Season ==
The team did not have a head coach but Harold Billings served as team manager.

Note: Massachusetts Institute of Technology athletics were referred to as 'Engineers' or 'Techmen' during the first two decades of the 20th century. By 1920 all sports programs had adopted the Engineer moniker.

== Roster ==
No.	Nat.	Player	Class	Pos	Height	Weight	DoB	Hometown	Previous team
		Harold Billings	Senior	D
		William Eichorn	Freshman	D
		Allen Gould	Senior	F/D
		Richard Gould	Junior	F
		Frederick Hurley	Senior	G
		William O'Hearn (C)	Senior	F
		Theodorus Polhemus	Junior	G
		John Scoville	Junior	F
		Vernon Sloan	Sophomore	F
		Henry Stucklen	Graduate	F

== Standings ==
1909–10 Collegiate ice hockey standings
	Intercollegiate							Overall					
	GP	W	L	T	PCT.	GF	GA	GP	W	L	T	GF	GA
Amherst	–	–	–	–	–	–	–	6	4	2	0	–	–
Army	5	0	3	2	.200	1	8	6	0	4	2	1	12
Carnegie Tech	7	5	1	1	.786	27	8	7	5	1	1	27	8
Case	–	–	–	–	–	–	–	–	–	–	–	–	–
Columbia	6	0	5	1	.083	2	22	7	1	5	1	7	26
Cornell	7	3	4	0	.429	18	18	7	3	4	0	18	18
Dartmouth	5	1	4	0	.200	7	16	8	1	7	0	8	25
Harvard	6	5	1	0	.833	23	4	8	6	2	0	36	11
Massachusetts Agricultural	6	3	3	0	.500	10	18	7	4	3	0	12	19
MIT	5	3	2	0	.600	19	9	8	4	4	0	29	25
Norwich	–	–	–	–	–	–	–	–	–	–	–	–	–
Pennsylvania	1	1	0	0	1.000	1	0	2	2	0	0	6	0
Penn State	2	0	2	0	.000	1	9	2	0	2	0	1	9
Pittsburgh	4	1	2	1	.375	4	6	4	1	2	1	4	6
Princeton	9	7	2	0	.778	24	12	10	7	3	0	24	16
Rensselaer	3	1	2	0	.333	4	7	3	1	2	0	4	7
Springfield Training	–	–	–	–	–	–	–	–	–	–	–	–	–
Trinity	–	–	–	–	–	–	–	–	–	–	–	–	–
Union	–	–	–	–	–	–	–	1	0	1	0	–	–
Wesleyan	–	–	–	–	–	–	–	–	–	–	–	–	–
Western Reserve	–	–	–	–	–	–	–	–	–	–	–	–	–
Williams	5	4	1	0	.800	28	8	7	6	1	0	39	12
Yale	14	8	6	0	.571	39	32	15	8	7	0	42	36

== Schedule and results ==
Date	Opponent	Site	Result	Record
Regular Season
December 24	vs. Crescent Hockey Club*	Harvard Stadium Rink • Boston, Massachusetts	W 5–1	1–0–0
January 1	vs. Dartmouth*	Brae Burn Rink • Newton, Massachusetts	W 1–0	2–0–0
January 6	at Harvard*	Harvard Stadium Rink • Boston, Massachusetts	L 1–4	2–1–0
January 8	at Brae Burn Country Club*	Brae Burn Rink • Newton, Massachusetts	L 3–8	2–2–0
January 28	vs. Rensselaer*	Empire Rink • Albany, New York	W 9–2	3–2–0
January 29	vs. Louden Field Club*	Empire Rink • Albany, New York	W 5–1	4–2–0
February 2	at Yale*	New Haven Lawn Club • New Haven, Connecticut	L 0–3	4–3–0
February 5	at Army*	Lusk Reservoir • West Point, New York	W 3–0	5–3–0
*Non-conference game.
