= 1909–10 Columbia men's ice hockey season =

- Conference: 6th IHA
- Home ice: St. Nicholas Rink

Record
- Overall: 1–5–0
- Conference: 0–5–0
- Home: 0–4–0
- Road: 1–1–0

Coaches and captains
- Head coach: Rudolph von Bernuth
- Captain: Robert Murphy

The 1909–10 Columbia men's ice hockey season was the 14th season of play for the program.

== Season ==
Ray Barnum served as team manager. Despite several players from the previous season's squad still being eligible, the entire forward contingent for Columbia were new team members. The inexperience showed in the IHA matches as Columbia was only able to score twice in five conference games. As a result, the icers finished winless in conference play for the second consecutive season.

Note: Columbia University adopted the Lion as its mascot in 1910.

== Roster ==
No.	Nat.	Player	Class	Pos	Height	Weight	DoB	Hometown	Previous team
		John S. Bates	Freshman	R/C
		John J. Cassidy Jr.	Freshman	C
		George S. Downing	Sophomore	D
		J. Phelps Harding	Freshman	LW
		Robert W. Harris	Freshman	RW
		P. G. Harrison	Graduate	LW
		Warren Kinney	Junior	D
		John Lovejoy (C)	Junior	D/LW
		James Mackenzie	Senior	D
		Howard F. Murchie	Senior	D
		Robert Murphy	Senior	G
		Rufus Trimble	Sophomore	RW

== Standings ==
1909–10 Collegiate ice hockey standings
	Intercollegiate							Overall					
	GP	W	L	T	PCT.	GF	GA	GP	W	L	T	GF	GA
Amherst	–	–	–	–	–	–	–	6	4	2	0	–	–
Army	5	0	3	2	.200	1	8	6	0	4	2	1	12
Carnegie Tech	7	5	1	1	.786	27	8	7	5	1	1	27	8
Case	–	–	–	–	–	–	–	–	–	–	–	–	–
Columbia	6	0	5	1	.083	2	22	7	1	5	1	7	26
Cornell	7	3	4	0	.429	18	18	7	3	4	0	18	18
Dartmouth	5	1	4	0	.200	7	16	8	1	7	0	8	25
Harvard	6	5	1	0	.833	23	4	8	6	2	0	36	11
Massachusetts Agricultural	6	3	3	0	.500	10	18	7	4	3	0	12	19
MIT	5	3	2	0	.600	19	9	8	4	4	0	29	25
Norwich	–	–	–	–	–	–	–	–	–	–	–	–	–
Pennsylvania	1	1	0	0	1.000	1	0	2	2	0	0	6	0
Penn State	2	0	2	0	.000	1	9	2	0	2	0	1	9
Pittsburgh	4	1	2	1	.375	4	6	4	1	2	1	4	6
Princeton	9	7	2	0	.778	24	12	10	7	3	0	24	16
Rensselaer	3	1	2	0	.333	4	7	3	1	2	0	4	7
Springfield Training	–	–	–	–	–	–	–	–	–	–	–	–	–
Trinity	–	–	–	–	–	–	–	–	–	–	–	–	–
Union	–	–	–	–	–	–	–	1	0	1	0	–	–
Wesleyan	–	–	–	–	–	–	–	–	–	–	–	–	–
Western Reserve	–	–	–	–	–	–	–	–	–	–	–	–	–
Williams	5	4	1	0	.800	28	8	7	6	1	0	39	12
Yale	14	8	6	0	.571	39	32	15	8	7	0	42	36

1909–10 Intercollegiate Hockey Association standings
	Conference								Overall					
	GP	W	L	T	PTS	GF	GA		GP	W	L	T	GF	GA
Princeton *	5	5	0	0	1.000	12	2		10	7	3	0	24	16
Harvard	5	4	1	0	.800	19	3		8	6	2	0	36	11
Cornell	4	2	2	0	.500	10	8	†	7	3	4	0	18	18
Yale	5	2	3	0	.400	12	12		15	8	7	0	42	36
Dartmouth	4	1	3	0	.250	7	15	†	8	1	7	0	8	25
Columbia	5	0	5	0	.000	2	22		7	1	5	1	7	26
* indicates conference champion † A game between Cornell and Dartmouth was suspended and later cancelled due to poor ice conditions

== Schedule and results ==
Date	Opponent	Site	Result	Record
Regular Season
December 18	at Englewood Field Club*	Englewood, New Jersey	W 5–4 ^{OT}	1–0–0
January 12	Harvard	Harvard Stadium Rink • Boston, Massachusetts	L 0–6	1–1–0 (0–1–0)
January 15	at Army*	Lusk Reservoir • West Point, New York	T 0–0	1–1–1
January 22	Princeton	St. Nicholas Rink • New York, New York	L 0–1	1–2–1 (0–2–0)
February 10	Yale	St. Nicholas Rink • New York, New York	L 1–5	1–3–1 (0–3–0)
February 17	Dartmouth	St. Nicholas Rink • New York, New York	L 0–3	1–4–1 (0–4–0)
February 26	Cornell	St. Nicholas Rink • New York, New York	L 1–7	1–5–1 (0–5–0)
*Non-conference game.
