= 1909–10 Army Cadets men's ice hockey season =

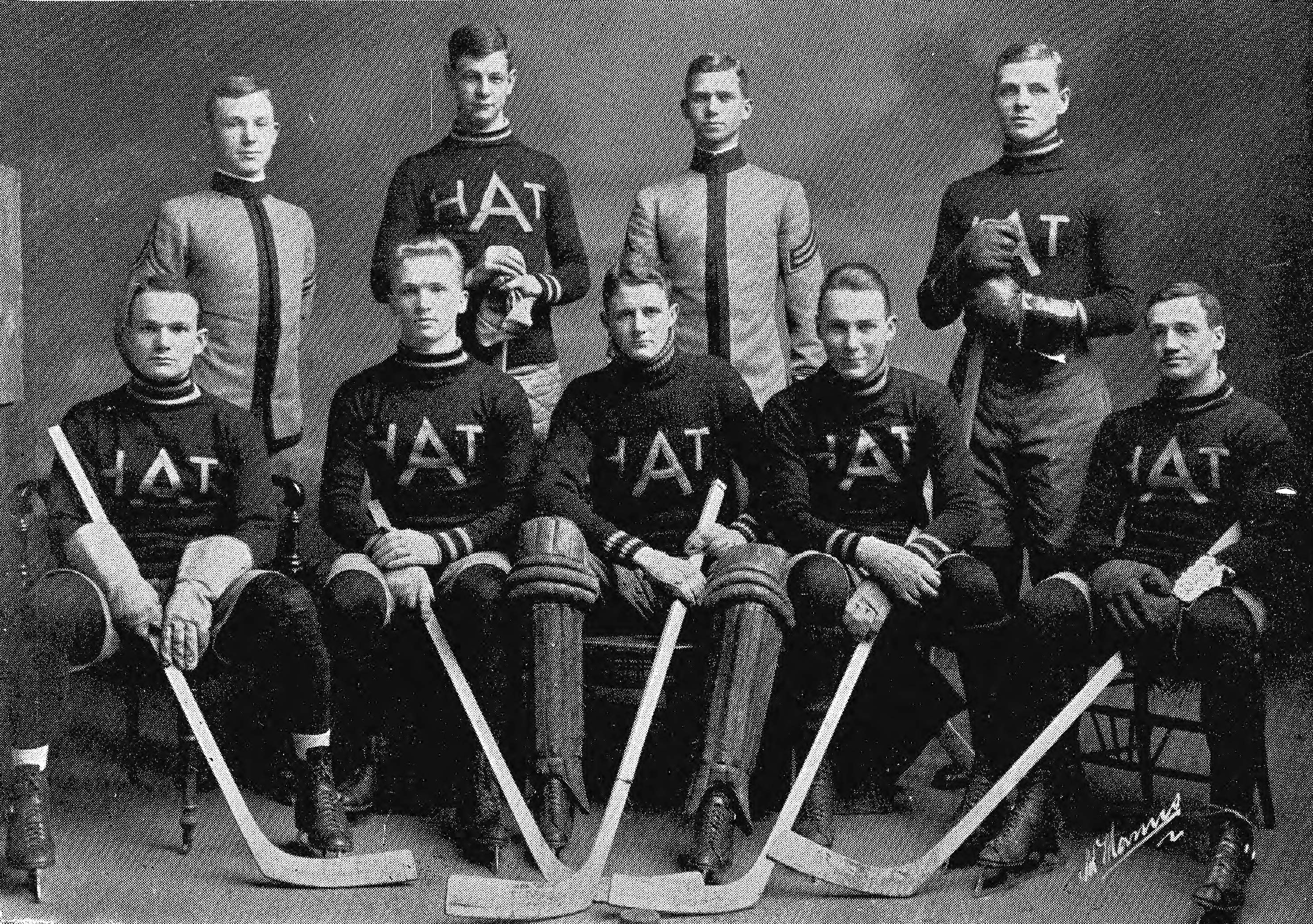
- Conference: Independent
- Home ice: Lusk Reservoir

Record
- Overall: 0–4–2
- Home: 0–4–2

Coaches and captains
- Head coach: George Russell
- Captain: Meade Wildrick

The 1909–10 Army Cadets men's ice hockey season was the 7th season of play for the program.

== Season ==
For the first time, Army played mostly against American colleges. Owing to the increased quality of their opposition as well as the lack of playing time the previous year, Army failed to win a single game this season and scored just 1 goal in 7 games.

== Roster ==
No.	Nat.	Player	Class	Pos	Height	Weight	DoB	Hometown	Previous team
	(United States)	Millard Harmon Jr.	Sophomore	R			1888-01-19	Fort Mason, California
	(United States)	Francis Miles	Senior	D			1887-12-20	Massachusetts
	(United States)	William Rosevear Jr.	Freshman	LW			1890-02-27	Wisconsin
	(United States)	Frank Schneider	Sophomore	C			1887-12-03	England
	(United States)	Franklin C. Sibert	Sophomore	RW			1891-01-03	Bowling Green, Kentucky
	(United States)	John Waterman	Senior	D			1887-05-03	Michigan
	(United States)	Meade Wildrick (C)	Senior	G			1887-05-16	New Jersey

== Standings ==
1909–10 Collegiate ice hockey standings
	Intercollegiate							Overall					
	GP	W	L	T	PCT.	GF	GA	GP	W	L	T	GF	GA
Amherst	–	–	–	–	–	–	–	6	4	2	0	–	–
Army	5	0	3	2	.200	1	8	6	0	4	2	1	12
Carnegie Tech	7	5	1	1	.786	27	8	7	5	1	1	27	8
Case	–	–	–	–	–	–	–	–	–	–	–	–	–
Columbia	6	0	5	1	.083	2	22	7	1	5	1	7	26
Cornell	7	3	4	0	.429	18	18	7	3	4	0	18	18
Dartmouth	5	1	4	0	.200	7	16	8	1	7	0	8	25
Harvard	6	5	1	0	.833	23	4	8	6	2	0	36	11
Massachusetts Agricultural	6	3	3	0	.500	10	18	7	4	3	0	12	19
MIT	5	3	2	0	.600	19	9	8	4	4	0	29	25
Norwich	–	–	–	–	–	–	–	–	–	–	–	–	–
Pennsylvania	1	1	0	0	1.000	1	0	2	2	0	0	6	0
Penn State	2	0	2	0	.000	1	9	2	0	2	0	1	9
Pittsburgh	4	1	2	1	.375	4	6	4	1	2	1	4	6
Princeton	9	7	2	0	.778	24	12	10	7	3	0	24	16
Rensselaer	3	1	2	0	.333	4	7	3	1	2	0	4	7
Springfield Training	–	–	–	–	–	–	–	–	–	–	–	–	–
Trinity	–	–	–	–	–	–	–	–	–	–	–	–	–
Union	–	–	–	–	–	–	–	1	0	1	0	–	–
Wesleyan	–	–	–	–	–	–	–	–	–	–	–	–	–
Western Reserve	–	–	–	–	–	–	–	–	–	–	–	–	–
Williams	5	4	1	0	.800	28	8	7	6	1	0	39	12
Yale	14	8	6	0	.571	39	32	15	8	7	0	42	36

== Schedule and results ==
Date	Opponent	Site	Result	Record
Regular Season
January 8	Pennsylvania*	Lusk Reservoir • West Point, New York	L 0–1 †	0–1–0
January 15	Columbia*	Lusk Reservoir • West Point, New York	T 0–0	0–1–1
February 3	Springfield Training*	Lusk Reservoir • West Point, New York	T 1–1	0–1–2
February 5	MIT*	Lusk Reservoir • West Point, New York	L 0–3	0–2–2
February 19	Rensselaer*	Lusk Reservoir • West Point, New York	L 0–3	0–3–2
February 26	N.Y. National Guard 7th Regiment*	Lusk Reservoir • West Point, New York	L 0–4	0–4–2
*Non-conference game.

† Army records the game as a 0–0 tie, however, contemporary news reports score the game as 1–0 in favor of Penn.
Some Army records include a 0–1 loss to Princeton on January 5. The game was scheduled but never played.
