= 1909–10 Penn Quakers men's ice hockey season =

Record
- Overall: 2–0–0
- Road: 2–0–0

Coaches and captains
- Captain: Charles Maits

The 1909–10 Penn Quakers men's ice hockey season was the 6th season of play for the program.

== Season ==
In its second season back, the ice hockey team was recognized as a minor sport by the university. Unlike the previous year, the weather grew cold enough that the team was able to hit the ice for practice in mid-December. Since the university did not have a rink of its own, the one utilized by Haverford College was used instead.

Their first game came against Army and through a hard-fought 30 minutes the Quakers proved victorious, earning the program's first win in over 9 years. After a second win three days later the team continued to practice for several weeks while they waited for their next game to be scheduled. In early February two games were arranged with Amherst and Rensselaer. Unfortunately the trip never took place and the season was ended very quietly.

== Roster ==
| No. | Nat. | Player | Class | Pos | Height | Weight | DoB | Hometown | Previous team |
|---|---|---|---|---|---|---|---|---|---|
| | | George E. H. DeWitt | Junior | C |
| | | Ray M. Gideon | Senior | LW |
| | | Robert E. Harlow | Sophomore | RW |
| | | Walter G. Hayden | Junior | D |
| | | Edward A. King | Sophomore | R |
| | | Charles B. Maits | Graduate | G |
| | | Thomas S. Newman | | D/RW |
| | | Edmund Thayer | Sophomore | LW |
| | | Ralph D. Ward | Sophomore | LW |
| | | Walter S. Ward | Freshman | G |
| | | W. H. Young | | D |

== Standings ==
1909–10 Collegiate ice hockey standings
| | Intercollegiate | | | | | | | Overall | | | | | |
| | GP | W | L | T | PCT. | GF | GA | GP | W | L | T | GF | GA |
|---|---|---|---|---|---|---|---|---|---|---|---|---|---|
| Amherst | – | – | – | – | – | – | – | 6 | 4 | 2 | 0 | – | – |
| Army | 5 | 0 | 3 | 2 | .200 | 1 | 8 | 6 | 0 | 4 | 2 | 1 | 12 |
| Carnegie Tech | 7 | 5 | 1 | 1 | .786 | 27 | 8 | 7 | 5 | 1 | 1 | 27 | 8 |
| Case | – | – | – | – | – | – | – | – | – | – | – | – | – |
| Columbia | 6 | 0 | 5 | 1 | .083 | 2 | 22 | 7 | 1 | 5 | 1 | 7 | 26 |
| Cornell | 7 | 3 | 4 | 0 | .429 | 18 | 18 | 7 | 3 | 4 | 0 | 18 | 18 |
| Dartmouth | 5 | 1 | 4 | 0 | .200 | 7 | 16 | 8 | 1 | 7 | 0 | 8 | 25 |
| Harvard | 6 | 5 | 1 | 0 | .833 | 23 | 4 | 8 | 6 | 2 | 0 | 36 | 11 |
| Massachusetts Agricultural | 6 | 3 | 3 | 0 | .500 | 10 | 18 | 7 | 4 | 3 | 0 | 12 | 19 |
| MIT | 5 | 3 | 2 | 0 | .600 | 19 | 9 | 8 | 4 | 4 | 0 | 29 | 25 |
| Norwich | – | – | – | – | – | – | – | – | – | – | – | – | – |
| Pennsylvania | 1 | 1 | 0 | 0 | 1.000 | 1 | 0 | 2 | 2 | 0 | 0 | 6 | 0 |
| Penn State | 2 | 0 | 2 | 0 | .000 | 1 | 9 | 2 | 0 | 2 | 0 | 1 | 9 |
| Pittsburgh | 4 | 1 | 2 | 1 | .375 | 4 | 6 | 4 | 1 | 2 | 1 | 4 | 6 |
| Princeton | 9 | 7 | 2 | 0 | .778 | 24 | 12 | 10 | 7 | 3 | 0 | 24 | 16 |
| Rensselaer | 3 | 1 | 2 | 0 | .333 | 4 | 7 | 3 | 1 | 2 | 0 | 4 | 7 |
| Springfield Training | – | – | – | – | – | – | – | – | – | – | – | – | – |
| Trinity | – | – | – | – | – | – | – | – | – | – | – | – | – |
| Union | – | – | – | – | – | – | – | 1 | 0 | 1 | 0 | – | – |
| Wesleyan | – | – | – | – | – | – | – | – | – | – | – | – | – |
| Western Reserve | – | – | – | – | – | – | – | – | – | – | – | – | – |
| Williams | 5 | 4 | 1 | 0 | .800 | 28 | 8 | 7 | 6 | 1 | 0 | 39 | 12 |
| Yale | 14 | 8 | 6 | 0 | .571 | 39 | 32 | 15 | 8 | 7 | 0 | 42 | 36 |

== Schedule and results ==
| Date | Opponent | Site | Result | Record |
Regular Season
| January 8 | at Army* | Lusk Reservoir • West Point, New York | W 1–0 | 1–0–0 |
| January 11 | at Swarthmore ^{†}* | Swarthmore, Pennsylvania | W 5–0 | 2–0–0 |
*Non-conference game.

† Swarthmore did not field a varsity team at this time.

== Scoring Statistics ==
| Name | Position | Games | Goals |
|---|---|---|---|
| DeWitt | C | 2 | 2 |
| King | R | 2 | 2 |
| Gideon | RW | 2 | 2 |
| Robert Harlow | RW | 1 | 0 |
| Thayer | LW | 2 | 0 |
| Ferris Ward | LW | 1 | 0 |
| Young | D | 1 | 0 |
| Charles Maits | G | 1 | 0 |
| W. Ward | G | 1 | 0 |
| Joseph Hayden | D | 2 | 0 |
| Newman | D/RW | 2 | 0 |
| Total | | | 6 |

Note: Assists were not recorded as a statistic.
