= 1909–10 RPI men's ice hockey season =

Hockey Season

- Conference: Independent

Record
- Overall: 1–2–0
- Home: 0–1–0
- Road: 1–1–0

Coaches and captains
- Captain: Paul Owen

The 1909–10 RPI men's ice hockey season was the 7th season of play for the program.

== Season ==
Note: Rensselaer's athletic teams were unofficially known as 'Cherry and White' until 1921 when the Engineers moniker debuted for the men's basketball team.

== Roster ==
No.	Nat.	Player	Class	Pos	Height	Weight	DoB	Hometown	Previous team
		Paul Owen (C)

== Standings ==
1909–10 Collegiate ice hockey standings
	Intercollegiate							Overall					
	GP	W	L	T	PCT.	GF	GA	GP	W	L	T	GF	GA
Amherst	–	–	–	–	–	–	–	6	4	2	0	–	–
Army	5	0	3	2	.200	1	8	6	0	4	2	1	12
Carnegie Tech	7	5	1	1	.786	27	8	7	5	1	1	27	8
Case	–	–	–	–	–	–	–	–	–	–	–	–	–
Columbia	6	0	5	1	.083	2	22	7	1	5	1	7	26
Cornell	7	3	4	0	.429	18	18	7	3	4	0	18	18
Dartmouth	5	1	4	0	.200	7	16	8	1	7	0	8	25
Harvard	6	5	1	0	.833	23	4	8	6	2	0	36	11
Massachusetts Agricultural	6	3	3	0	.500	10	18	7	4	3	0	12	19
MIT	5	3	2	0	.600	19	9	8	4	4	0	29	25
Norwich	–	–	–	–	–	–	–	–	–	–	–	–	–
Pennsylvania	1	1	0	0	1.000	1	0	2	2	0	0	6	0
Penn State	2	0	2	0	.000	1	9	2	0	2	0	1	9
Pittsburgh	4	1	2	1	.375	4	6	4	1	2	1	4	6
Princeton	9	7	2	0	.778	24	12	10	7	3	0	24	16
Rensselaer	3	1	2	0	.333	4	7	3	1	2	0	4	7
Springfield Training	–	–	–	–	–	–	–	–	–	–	–	–	–
Trinity	–	–	–	–	–	–	–	–	–	–	–	–	–
Union	–	–	–	–	–	–	–	1	0	1	0	–	–
Wesleyan	–	–	–	–	–	–	–	–	–	–	–	–	–
Western Reserve	–	–	–	–	–	–	–	–	–	–	–	–	–
Williams	5	4	1	0	.800	28	8	7	6	1	0	39	12
Yale	14	8	6	0	.571	39	32	15	8	7	0	42	36

== Schedule and results ==
Date	Opponent	Site	Result	Record
Regular Season
January 29	Williams*	Empire Rink • Albany, New York	L 1–4	0–1–0
February 5	at Amherst*	Amherst, Massachusetts	L 0–3	0–2–0
February 19	at Army*	Lusk Reservoir • West Point, New York	W 3–0	1–2–0
*Non-conference game.
