= 1904–05 United States collegiate men's ice hockey season =

- Duration: December 1904– March 1905
- Collegiate champion: Harvard

The 1904–05 United States collegiate men's ice hockey season was the 11th season of collegiate ice hockey.

Due to a lack of ice facilities, many programs were suspended starting in 1904. The schools to cease their ice hockey teams include Cornell University, Rensselaer Polytechnic Institute, Union College and Williams College. Most would eventually restart their programs.

== Regular season ==
=== Standings ===
1904–05 Collegiate ice hockey standings
	Intercollegiate							Overall					
	GP	W	L	T	PCT.	GF	GA	GP	W	L	T	GF	GA
Army	1	1	0	0	1.000	6	2	8	7	1	0	23	7
Brown	4	0	4	0	.000	3	35	5	0	5	0	5	38
Columbia	4	2	2	0	.500	9	17	8	4	4	0	23	39
Harvard	6	6	0	0	1.000	65	9	10	10	0	0	97	16
MIT	2	0	2	0	.000	2	32	9	6	3	0	60	46
Polytechnic Institute of Brooklyn	–	–	–	–	–	–	–	–	–	–	–	–	–
Princeton	4	1	3	0	.250	15	18	6	1	4	1	15	32
Springfield Training	–	–	–	–	–	–	–	–	–	–	–	–	–
Yale	4	3	1	0	.750	30	14	9	5	4	0	37	29

1904–05 Intercollegiate Hockey Association standings
	Conference							Overall					
	GP	W	L	T	PTS	GF	GA	GP	W	L	T	GF	GA
Harvard *	4	4	0	0	8	33	7	10	10	0	0	97	16
Yale	4	3	1	0	6	30	14	9	5	4	0	37	29
Columbia	4	2	2	0	4	9	17	8	4	4	0	23	39
Princeton	4	1	3	0	2	15	18	6	1	4	1	15	32
Brown	4	0	4	0	0	3	35	5	0	5	0	5	38
* indicates conference champion
