= 1909–10 Harvard Crimson men's ice hockey season =

College ice hockey season

- Conference: 2nd IHA
- Home ice: Harvard Stadium Rink

Record
- Overall: 6–2–0
- Conference: 4–1–0
- Home: 3–1–0
- Road: 2–1–0
- Neutral: 1–0–0

Coaches and captains
- Head coach: Alfred Winsor
- Assistant coaches: Richard Townsend; Thompson Sampson
- Captain: Trafford Hicks

The 1909–10 Harvard Crimson men's ice hockey season was the 13th season of play for the program.

== Season ==
Harvard began the season well, winning two preliminary games before taking the first two IHA contests by dominating the opposition. When they traveled to New York to play Princeton the Crimson were in good position to remain as the Intercollegiate Hockey Association but instead Harvard was shutout by the Tigers. The blanking was just the second time Harvard had failed to score in a game in program history, the first coming in their debut match in 1898.

After a poor showing against St. Francis Xavier Harvard ended with two further shutouts of conference opponents to finish second in the IHA.

== Roster ==
No.	Nat.	Player	Class	Pos	Height	Weight	DoB	Hometown	Previous team
	(United States)	Robert Blackall	Sophomore	D	5' 9" (1.75 m)	168 lb (76 kg)	1889-04-26	Cambridge, Massachusetts
		Gilbert G. Browne	Senior	G/F
	(United States)	Roger W. Cutler	Junior	F			1889-11-03	Brookline, Massachusetts
	(United States)	Oliver Chadwick		G			1888-09-23	Lowell, Massachusetts
		Robert Duncan	Sophomore	F	5' 6" (1.68 m)	132 lb (60 kg)
		Newton Foster	Junior	D
		Arnold Fraser-Campbell	Graduate	D
	(United States)	George Gardner	Senior	F			1888-01-28	Boston, Massachusetts
	(United States)	S. Trafford Hicks (C)	Senior	F			1888-04-03	Arlington, Massachusetts
	(United States)	Ralph Hornblower	Junior	F			1892-11-17	Arlington, Massachusetts
		Philip Houston	Sophomore	D
	(United States)	Frederic Huntington	Sophomore	F/D	5' 8" (1.73 m)	165 lb (75 kg)	1889-12-05	Ashfield, Massachusetts
		Frederick Kirkland	Senior	F
		Howard Leslie	Sophomore	F
	(United States)	William Morgan	Junior	F			1889-03-13	Short Hills, New Jersey
		Paul		D
		Rice		D
		Paul Smart	Sophomore	G	5' 7" (1.7 m)	150 lb (68 kg)
		Samuel Whidden	Senior	F
	(United States)	Richard Wigglesworth	Sophomore	F			1891-04-25	Boston, Massachusetts

== Standings ==
1909–10 Collegiate ice hockey standings
	Intercollegiate							Overall					
	GP	W	L	T	PCT.	GF	GA	GP	W	L	T	GF	GA
Amherst	–	–	–	–	–	–	–	6	4	2	0	–	–
Army	5	0	3	2	.200	1	8	6	0	4	2	1	12
Carnegie Tech	7	5	1	1	.786	27	8	7	5	1	1	27	8
Case	–	–	–	–	–	–	–	–	–	–	–	–	–
Columbia	6	0	5	1	.083	2	22	7	1	5	1	7	26
Cornell	7	3	4	0	.429	18	18	7	3	4	0	18	18
Dartmouth	5	1	4	0	.200	7	16	8	1	7	0	8	25
Harvard	6	5	1	0	.833	23	4	8	6	2	0	36	11
Massachusetts Agricultural	6	3	3	0	.500	10	18	7	4	3	0	12	19
MIT	5	3	2	0	.600	19	9	8	4	4	0	29	25
Norwich	–	–	–	–	–	–	–	–	–	–	–	–	–
Pennsylvania	1	1	0	0	1.000	1	0	2	2	0	0	6	0
Penn State	2	0	2	0	.000	1	9	2	0	2	0	1	9
Pittsburgh	4	1	2	1	.375	4	6	4	1	2	1	4	6
Princeton	9	7	2	0	.778	24	12	10	7	3	0	24	16
Rensselaer	3	1	2	0	.333	4	7	3	1	2	0	4	7
Springfield Training	–	–	–	–	–	–	–	–	–	–	–	–	–
Trinity	–	–	–	–	–	–	–	–	–	–	–	–	–
Union	–	–	–	–	–	–	–	1	0	1	0	–	–
Wesleyan	–	–	–	–	–	–	–	–	–	–	–	–	–
Western Reserve	–	–	–	–	–	–	–	–	–	–	–	–	–
Williams	5	4	1	0	.800	28	8	7	6	1	0	39	12
Yale	14	8	6	0	.571	39	32	15	8	7	0	42	36

1909–10 Intercollegiate Hockey Association standings
	Conference								Overall					
	GP	W	L	T	PTS	GF	GA		GP	W	L	T	GF	GA
Princeton *	5	5	0	0	1.000	12	2		10	7	3	0	24	16
Harvard	5	4	1	0	.800	19	3		8	6	2	0	36	11
Cornell	4	2	2	0	.500	10	8	†	7	3	4	0	18	18
Yale	5	2	3	0	.400	12	12		15	8	7	0	42	36
Dartmouth	4	1	3	0	.250	7	15	†	8	1	7	0	8	25
Columbia	5	0	5	0	.000	2	22		7	1	5	1	7	26
* indicates conference champion † A game between Cornell and Dartmouth was suspended and later cancelled due to poor ice conditions

== Schedule and results ==
Date	Opponent	Site	Result	Record
Regular Season
December 21	at Brae Burn Country Club*	Brae Burn Rink • West Newton, Massachusetts	W 12–3	1–0–0
January 5	MIT*	Harvard Stadium Rink • Boston, Massachusetts	W 4–1	2–0–0
January 8	vs. Cornell	St. Nicholas Rink • New York, New York	W 5–0	3–0–0 (1–0–0)
January 12	Columbia	Harvard Stadium Rink • Boston, Massachusetts	W 6–0	4–0–0 (2–0–0)
January 15	vs. Princeton	St. Nicholas Rink • New York, New York	L 0–3	4–1–0 (2–1–0)
February 5	St. Francis Xavier*	Harvard Stadium Rink • Boston, Massachusetts	L 1–4	4–2–0
February 12	Dartmouth	Harvard Stadium Rink • Boston, Massachusetts	W 5–0	5–2–0 (3–1–0)
February 19	vs. Yale	St. Nicholas Rink • New York, New York (Rivalry)	W 3–0	6–2–0 (4–1–0)
*Non-conference game.

== Scoring Statistics ==
Name	Position	Games	Goals
Trafford Hicks	F	7	14
George Gardner	F	8	8
Ralph Hornblower	F	7	4
Robert Duncan	F	6	3
William Morgan	F	2	2
Arnold Fraser-Campbell	F	1	1
Robert Blackall	F/D	4	1
Richard Wigglesworth	F	4	1
Newton Foster	D	7	1
Howard Leslie	F	7	1
Frederick Kirkland	F	1	0
Cutler	F	1	0
Rice	F	1	0
Samuel Whidden	F	1	0
Philip Houston	D	1	0
Paul	D	1	0
Browne	G/F	2	0
Paul Smart	G	3	0
Frederic Huntington	D	7	0
Oliver Chadwick	G	7	0
Total			36

Note: Assists were not recorded as a statistic.
