= 1909–10 Pittsburgh Panthers men's ice hockey season =

- Conference: 2nd Intercollegiate League
- Home ice: Duquesne Garden

Record
- Overall: 1–2–1
- Conference: 1–2–1
- Road: 1–0–0
- Neutral: 0–2–1

Coaches and captains
- Head coach: Dr. Milliken

The 1909–10 Pittsburgh men's ice hockey season was the 7th season of play for the program.

== Season ==
Pittsburgh formed a local Intercollegiate League with Carnegie Tech and Penn State. With the demise of the WPHL the year before the Duquesne Garden had plenty of available ice time and the arena's operators agreed not only to host all games between the three teams but to assume all resulting financial obligations. The schedule began in December 1909 with a 2–2 tie between the Panthers and the Tartans. Penn State lost two games around Christmas (one to Pittsburgh) but soon thereafter the faculty at Penn State required their team to withdraw from the league and return to campus. Pittsburgh and Carnegie Tech played two more times with the Tartans winning both. Case and Western Reserve, colleges located in the Cleveland area, were both invited to join the League after Penn State's departure, but neither school responded.

Very little enthusiasm for the program was expressed by the student body, according to contemporary reports. With an unenthusiastic audience and a dearth of competition the Panthers shuttered their program.

== Roster ==
No.	Nat.	Player	Class	Pos	Height	Weight	DoB	Hometown	Previous team
		William Askins		LW
		A. I. Boyle Jr.	Graduate	R
		Clarence Hagan	Junior	G
		Haggerty		C
		Lambing		RW
		K. D. McCutcheon	Junior	D
		William McDaniels	Sophomore	LW
		W. F. Mueller	Graduate	D
		C. S. Reed	Junior	G

== Standings ==
1909–10 Collegiate ice hockey standings
	Intercollegiate							Overall					
	GP	W	L	T	PCT.	GF	GA	GP	W	L	T	GF	GA
Amherst	–	–	–	–	–	–	–	6	4	2	0	–	–
Army	5	0	3	2	.200	1	8	6	0	4	2	1	12
Carnegie Tech	7	5	1	1	.786	27	8	7	5	1	1	27	8
Case	–	–	–	–	–	–	–	–	–	–	–	–	–
Columbia	6	0	5	1	.083	2	22	7	1	5	1	7	26
Cornell	7	3	4	0	.429	18	18	7	3	4	0	18	18
Dartmouth	5	1	4	0	.200	7	16	8	1	7	0	8	25
Harvard	6	5	1	0	.833	23	4	8	6	2	0	36	11
Massachusetts Agricultural	6	3	3	0	.500	10	18	7	4	3	0	12	19
MIT	5	3	2	0	.600	19	9	8	4	4	0	29	25
Norwich	–	–	–	–	–	–	–	–	–	–	–	–	–
Pennsylvania	1	1	0	0	1.000	1	0	2	2	0	0	6	0
Penn State	2	0	2	0	.000	1	9	2	0	2	0	1	9
Pittsburgh	4	1	2	1	.375	4	6	4	1	2	1	4	6
Princeton	9	7	2	0	.778	24	12	10	7	3	0	24	16
Rensselaer	3	1	2	0	.333	4	7	3	1	2	0	4	7
Springfield Training	–	–	–	–	–	–	–	–	–	–	–	–	–
Trinity	–	–	–	–	–	–	–	–	–	–	–	–	–
Union	–	–	–	–	–	–	–	1	0	1	0	–	–
Wesleyan	–	–	–	–	–	–	–	–	–	–	–	–	–
Western Reserve	–	–	–	–	–	–	–	–	–	–	–	–	–
Williams	5	4	1	0	.800	28	8	7	6	1	0	39	12
Yale	14	8	6	0	.571	39	32	15	8	7	0	42	36

== Schedule and results ==
Date	Opponent	Site	Result	Record
Regular Season
December 18	vs. Carnegie Tech	Duquesne Garden • Pittsburgh, Pennsylvania	L 0–1	0–1–0 (0–1–0)
January 1	Penn State	Duquesne Garden • Pittsburgh, Pennsylvania	W 2–1	1–1–0 (1–1–0)
January 8	vs. Carnegie Tech	Duquesne Garden • Pittsburgh, Pennsylvania	T 1–1	1–1–1 (1–1–1)
January 22	vs. Carnegie Tech	Duquesne Garden • Pittsburgh, Pennsylvania	L 1–3	1–2–1 (1–2–1)
*Non-conference game.
