= 1909–10 Princeton Tigers men's ice hockey season =

College ice hockey season

Intercollegiate Champion Intercollegiate Hockey Association, Champion
- Conference: 1st IHA
- Home ice: Lake Carnegie

Record
- Overall: 7–3–0
- Conference: 5–0–0
- Road: 1–0–0
- Neutral: 6–3–0

Coaches and captains
- Captain: Clarence Peacock Jr.

The 1909–10 Princeton Tigers men's ice hockey season was the 11th season of play for the program.

== Season ==
Princeton returned few players from the previous year's team and used its early-season games essentially as live practices for the new players. With mostly inexperienced lineups the Tigers were outmatched against amateur clubs with more veteran rosters. Even in large defeats, however, team captain Clarence Peacock's goaltending was in fine form. The team decided on its starting roster and went into their holiday break with a slate of five games before the IHA season started. Despite the early games Princeton was still sluggish at the start of their trip, losing both games in New York. The team finally began to pull together in their three-game series against Yale, taking two out of three games.

The Tigers opened their conference schedule with Cornell's first game as a member. The two teams fought a tough match that required two extra periods to decide the winner but it the lone goal came from Kay to give Princeton the win. After defeating Dartmouth the Tigers entered the game against Harvard with a chance to take a commanding lead in the IHA. With a stellar defensive effort, Princeton handed the Crimson just the second shutout in program history and took the match 3–0. After dropping Columbia Princeton was one game away from their second championship and while it was their last game, by a quirk of the schedule, Yale had yet to play a conference match. If they lost the game to the Elis it could mean surrendering the crown if Yale were to sweep the remainder of their games. Two goals from Kay provided all the offense the Tigers needed and with the 2–1 victory Princeton was the Intercollegiate Hockey Association champion yet again.

After the season, eight members of the team were awarded athletic letters by the university, making this the first ice hockey team in school history to have lettermen.

R. W. Gibbs served as team manager.

== Roster ==
| No. | Nat. | Player | Class | Pos | Height | Weight | DoB | Hometown | Previous team |
|---|---|---|---|---|---|---|---|---|---|
| | | Montgomery Angell | Junior | F |
| | | Lawrence Blair | Sophomore | D |
| | | Eugene Connett | Sophomore | F |
| | (United States) | Alfred Kay | Sophomore | F | | | | Pittsburgh, Pennsylvania |
| | | Dean Mathey | Sophomore | F |
| | | James McKinney | Sophomore | F |
| | | Clarence Peacock Jr. (C) | Senior | G |
| | | Frederic Read | Senior | D |
| | | Howard Sawyer | Sophomore | F |

== Standings ==
1909–10 Collegiate ice hockey standings
| | Intercollegiate | | | | | | | Overall | | | | | |
| | GP | W | L | T | PCT. | GF | GA | GP | W | L | T | GF | GA |
|---|---|---|---|---|---|---|---|---|---|---|---|---|---|
| Amherst | – | – | – | – | – | – | – | 6 | 4 | 2 | 0 | – | – |
| Army | 5 | 0 | 3 | 2 | .200 | 1 | 8 | 6 | 0 | 4 | 2 | 1 | 12 |
| Carnegie Tech | 7 | 5 | 1 | 1 | .786 | 27 | 8 | 7 | 5 | 1 | 1 | 27 | 8 |
| Case | – | – | – | – | – | – | – | – | – | – | – | – | – |
| Columbia | 6 | 0 | 5 | 1 | .083 | 2 | 22 | 7 | 1 | 5 | 1 | 7 | 26 |
| Cornell | 7 | 3 | 4 | 0 | .429 | 18 | 18 | 7 | 3 | 4 | 0 | 18 | 18 |
| Dartmouth | 5 | 1 | 4 | 0 | .200 | 7 | 16 | 8 | 1 | 7 | 0 | 8 | 25 |
| Harvard | 6 | 5 | 1 | 0 | .833 | 23 | 4 | 8 | 6 | 2 | 0 | 36 | 11 |
| Massachusetts Agricultural | 6 | 3 | 3 | 0 | .500 | 10 | 18 | 7 | 4 | 3 | 0 | 12 | 19 |
| MIT | 5 | 3 | 2 | 0 | .600 | 19 | 9 | 8 | 4 | 4 | 0 | 29 | 25 |
| Norwich | – | – | – | – | – | – | – | – | – | – | – | – | – |
| Pennsylvania | 1 | 1 | 0 | 0 | 1.000 | 1 | 0 | 2 | 2 | 0 | 0 | 6 | 0 |
| Penn State | 2 | 0 | 2 | 0 | .000 | 1 | 9 | 2 | 0 | 2 | 0 | 1 | 9 |
| Pittsburgh | 4 | 1 | 2 | 1 | .375 | 4 | 6 | 4 | 1 | 2 | 1 | 4 | 6 |
| Princeton | 9 | 7 | 2 | 0 | .778 | 24 | 12 | 10 | 7 | 3 | 0 | 24 | 16 |
| Rensselaer | 3 | 1 | 2 | 0 | .333 | 4 | 7 | 3 | 1 | 2 | 0 | 4 | 7 |
| Springfield Training | – | – | – | – | – | – | – | – | – | – | – | – | – |
| Trinity | – | – | – | – | – | – | – | – | – | – | – | – | – |
| Union | – | – | – | – | – | – | – | 1 | 0 | 1 | 0 | – | – |
| Wesleyan | – | – | – | – | – | – | – | – | – | – | – | – | – |
| Western Reserve | – | – | – | – | – | – | – | – | – | – | – | – | – |
| Williams | 5 | 4 | 1 | 0 | .800 | 28 | 8 | 7 | 6 | 1 | 0 | 39 | 12 |
| Yale | 14 | 8 | 6 | 0 | .571 | 39 | 32 | 15 | 8 | 7 | 0 | 42 | 36 |

1909–10 Intercollegiate Hockey Association standings
| | Conference | | | | | | | | Overall | | | | | |
| | GP | W | L | T | PTS | GF | GA | | GP | W | L | T | GF | GA |
|---|---|---|---|---|---|---|---|---|---|---|---|---|---|---|
| Princeton * | 5 | 5 | 0 | 0 | 1.000 | 12 | 2 | | 10 | 7 | 3 | 0 | 24 | 16 |
| Harvard | 5 | 4 | 1 | 0 | .800 | 19 | 3 | | 8 | 6 | 2 | 0 | 36 | 11 |
| Cornell | 4 | 2 | 2 | 0 | .500 | 10 | 8 | † | 7 | 3 | 4 | 0 | 18 | 18 |
| Yale | 5 | 2 | 3 | 0 | .400 | 12 | 12 | | 15 | 8 | 7 | 0 | 42 | 36 |
| Dartmouth | 4 | 1 | 3 | 0 | .250 | 7 | 15 | † | 8 | 1 | 7 | 0 | 8 | 25 |
| Columbia | 5 | 0 | 5 | 0 | .000 | 2 | 22 | | 7 | 1 | 5 | 1 | 7 | 26 |
* indicates conference champion † A game between Cornell and Dartmouth was suspended and later cancelled due to poor ice conditions

== Schedule and results ==
| Date | Opponent | Site | Result | Record |
Regular Season
| December 8 | vs. New York Wanderers* | St. Nicholas Rink • New York, New York (Exhibition) | L 0–4 | |
| December 14 | at St. Nicholas Hockey Club* | St. Nicholas Rink • New York, New York (Exhibition) | L 1–11 | |
| December 16 | at New York Hockey Club* | St. Nicholas Rink • New York, New York (Exhibition) | T 2–2 | |
| December 21 | vs. St. Paul's School* | St. Nicholas Rink • New York, New York | L 0–4 | 0–1–0 |
| December 23 | vs. Williams* | St. Nicholas Rink • New York, New York | L 4–5 | 0–2–0 |
| December 29 | vs. Yale* | Duquesne Garden • Pittsburgh, Pennsylvania | W 2–1 | 1–2–0 |
| December 30 | vs. Yale* | Duquesne Garden • Pittsburgh, Pennsylvania | L 1–2 | 1–3–0 |
| December 31 | vs. Yale* | Duquesne Garden • Pittsburgh, Pennsylvania | W 5–2 | 2–3–0 |
| January 5 | vs. Cornell | St. Nicholas Rink • New York, New York | W 1–0 ^{2OT} | 3–3–0 (1–0–0) |
| January 12 | vs. Dartmouth | St. Nicholas Rink • New York, New York | W 5–1 | 4–3–0 (2–0–0) |
| January 15 | vs. Harvard | St. Nicholas Rink • New York, New York | W 3–0 | 5–3–0 (3–0–0) |
| January 22 | at Columbia | St. Nicholas Rink • New York, New York | W 1–0 | 6–3–0 (4–0–0) |
| January 26 | vs. Yale | St. Nicholas Rink • New York, New York | W 2–1 | 7–3–0 (5–0–0) |
*Non-conference game.
