= 1909–10 Cornell Big Red men's ice hockey season =

- Conference: 3rd IHA
- Home ice: Beebe Lake

Record
- Overall: 3–4–0
- Conference: 2–2–0
- Road: 1–0–0
- Neutral: 2–4–0

Coaches and captains
- Head coach: Talbot Hunter
- Captain: William Matchneer

The 1909–10 Cornell Big Red men's ice hockey season was the 9th season of play for the program.

== Season ==
After being rejected the year before, Cornell was admitted to the Intercollegiate Hockey Association. Unfortunately, warm weather prevented the Big Red from playing any home games for the second year in a row. In order to help the team live up to expectations, Talbot Hunter was hired as head coach and began working with the team on January 1.

Cornell opened its season with a three-game series versus Yale in Cleveland. The Elis won the first two matched but Cornell fought back to claim the third contest. The Big Red began the IHA season two days later, losing to Princeton and Harvard in quick succession. Cornell had to wait until February to continue their season but the break allowed the gain their second wind and defeat Yale for their first ever conference victory. The game against Columbia was postponed for two weeks but when it was finally played the Big Red hadn't lost any of their steam and evened their conference record to 2–2. Cornell was supposed to play Dartmouth on February 9 but that game was postponed indefinitely. Attempts were made to have the game played later but with neither team in contention for the championship the game was eventually cancelled.

Despite the rough start to the IHA season Cornell finished strong and hopes were high for the following year.

F. S. Bosworth served as team manager.

== Roster ==
No.	Nat.	Player	Class	Pos	Height	Weight	DoB	Hometown	Previous team
	(Canada)	Frank Crassweller	Junior	W			1887-10-13	Huron, Ontario
		Harold Jones	Senior	W
	(United States)	Clarence Lally	Senior	D			1888-06-23	Cleveland, Ohio
		Lawrence
	(United States)	Alexius Loughran					1888-10-06	New York, New York
	(United States)	Edmund Magner	Junior	C			1888-02-10	Kalamazoo, Michigan
		William Matchneer (C)	Senior	R			1886-12-04
	(United States)	Albert Matthai	Junior	G			1887-08-23	Baltimore, Maryland
		Eugene L. Smith	Junior	D
	(United States)	Malcolm Vail	Sophomore	G			1888-10-04	Highland Park, Illinois
	(United States)	Munroe Warner	Sophomore	D				Duluth, Minnesota

== Standings ==
1909–10 Collegiate ice hockey standings
	Intercollegiate							Overall					
	GP	W	L	T	PCT.	GF	GA	GP	W	L	T	GF	GA
Amherst	–	–	–	–	–	–	–	6	4	2	0	–	–
Army	5	0	3	2	.200	1	8	6	0	4	2	1	12
Carnegie Tech	7	5	1	1	.786	27	8	7	5	1	1	27	8
Case	–	–	–	–	–	–	–	–	–	–	–	–	–
Columbia	6	0	5	1	.083	2	22	7	1	5	1	7	26
Cornell	7	3	4	0	.429	18	18	7	3	4	0	18	18
Dartmouth	5	1	4	0	.200	7	16	8	1	7	0	8	25
Harvard	6	5	1	0	.833	23	4	8	6	2	0	36	11
Massachusetts Agricultural	6	3	3	0	.500	10	18	7	4	3	0	12	19
MIT	5	3	2	0	.600	19	9	8	4	4	0	29	25
Norwich	–	–	–	–	–	–	–	–	–	–	–	–	–
Pennsylvania	1	1	0	0	1.000	1	0	2	2	0	0	6	0
Penn State	2	0	2	0	.000	1	9	2	0	2	0	1	9
Pittsburgh	4	1	2	1	.375	4	6	4	1	2	1	4	6
Princeton	9	7	2	0	.778	24	12	10	7	3	0	24	16
Rensselaer	3	1	2	0	.333	4	7	3	1	2	0	4	7
Springfield Training	–	–	–	–	–	–	–	–	–	–	–	–	–
Trinity	–	–	–	–	–	–	–	–	–	–	–	–	–
Union	–	–	–	–	–	–	–	1	0	1	0	–	–
Wesleyan	–	–	–	–	–	–	–	–	–	–	–	–	–
Western Reserve	–	–	–	–	–	–	–	–	–	–	–	–	–
Williams	5	4	1	0	.800	28	8	7	6	1	0	39	12
Yale	14	8	6	0	.571	39	32	15	8	7	0	42	36

1909–10 Intercollegiate Hockey Association standings
	Conference								Overall					
	GP	W	L	T	PTS	GF	GA		GP	W	L	T	GF	GA
Princeton *	5	5	0	0	1.000	12	2		10	7	3	0	24	16
Harvard	5	4	1	0	.800	19	3		8	6	2	0	36	11
Cornell	4	2	2	0	.500	10	8	†	7	3	4	0	18	18
Yale	5	2	3	0	.400	12	12		15	8	7	0	42	36
Dartmouth	4	1	3	0	.250	7	15	†	8	1	7	0	8	25
Columbia	5	0	5	0	.000	2	22		7	1	5	1	7	26
* indicates conference champion † A game between Cornell and Dartmouth was suspended and later cancelled due to poor ice conditions

== Schedule and results ==
Date	Opponent	Site	Result	Record
Regular season
January 1	vs. Yale*	Elysium Arena • Cleveland, Ohio	L 3–5	0–1–0
January 3	vs. Yale*	Elysium Arena • Cleveland, Ohio	L 2–4	0–2–0
January 4	vs. Yale*	Elysium Arena • Cleveland, Ohio	W 3–1	1–2–0
January 5	vs. Princeton	St. Nicholas Rink • New York, New York	L 0–1 ^{2OT}	1–3–0 (0–1–0)
January 8	vs. Harvard	St. Nicholas Rink • New York, New York	L 0–5	1–4–0 (0–2–0)
February 5	vs. Yale	St. Nicholas Rink • New York, New York	W 3–1	2–4–0 (1–2–0)
February 26	at Columbia	St. Nicholas Rink • New York, New York	W 7–1	3–4–0 (2–2–0)
*Non-conference game.
