= 1909–10 Penn State Nittany Lions men's ice hockey season =

- Conference: 3rd Intercollegiate League

Record
- Overall: 0–2–0
- Conference: 0–2–0
- Road: 0–2–0

Coaches and captains
- Head coach: Lorne Campbell
- Captain: Herb Baetz

The 1909–10 Penn State Nittany Lions men's ice hockey season was the inaugural season of play for the program.

== Season ==
Penn State agreed to form an Intercollegiate League with Carnegie Tech and Pittsburgh. Due to the demise of the WPHL the year before the operators of the Duquesne Garden agreed not only to host all games between the three teams but to assume all resulting financial obligations. Penn State played its first game against the Tartans on Christmas day 1909. Their second game came a week later but soon thereafter the faculty at State College required the team to leave the League and return to campus.

Penn State would not play another varsity game until 1940.

== Roster ==
No.	Nat.	Player	Class	Pos	Height	Weight	DoB	Hometown	Previous team
		Herb Baetz (C)

== Standings ==
1909–10 Collegiate ice hockey standings
	Intercollegiate							Overall					
	GP	W	L	T	PCT.	GF	GA	GP	W	L	T	GF	GA
Amherst	–	–	–	–	–	–	–	6	4	2	0	–	–
Army	5	0	3	2	.200	1	8	6	0	4	2	1	12
Carnegie Tech	7	5	1	1	.786	27	8	7	5	1	1	27	8
Case	–	–	–	–	–	–	–	–	–	–	–	–	–
Columbia	6	0	5	1	.083	2	22	7	1	5	1	7	26
Cornell	7	3	4	0	.429	18	18	7	3	4	0	18	18
Dartmouth	5	1	4	0	.200	7	16	8	1	7	0	8	25
Harvard	6	5	1	0	.833	23	4	8	6	2	0	36	11
Massachusetts Agricultural	6	3	3	0	.500	10	18	7	4	3	0	12	19
MIT	5	3	2	0	.600	19	9	8	4	4	0	29	25
Norwich	–	–	–	–	–	–	–	–	–	–	–	–	–
Pennsylvania	1	1	0	0	1.000	1	0	2	2	0	0	6	0
Penn State	2	0	2	0	.000	1	9	2	0	2	0	1	9
Pittsburgh	4	1	2	1	.375	4	6	4	1	2	1	4	6
Princeton	9	7	2	0	.778	24	12	10	7	3	0	24	16
Rensselaer	3	1	2	0	.333	4	7	3	1	2	0	4	7
Springfield Training	–	–	–	–	–	–	–	–	–	–	–	–	–
Trinity	–	–	–	–	–	–	–	–	–	–	–	–	–
Union	–	–	–	–	–	–	–	1	0	1	0	–	–
Wesleyan	–	–	–	–	–	–	–	–	–	–	–	–	–
Western Reserve	–	–	–	–	–	–	–	–	–	–	–	–	–
Williams	5	4	1	0	.800	28	8	7	6	1	0	39	12
Yale	14	8	6	0	.571	39	32	15	8	7	0	42	36

== Schedule and results ==
Date	Opponent	Site	Result	Record
Regular season
December 25	at Carnegie Tech	Duquesne Garden • Pittsburgh, Pennsylvania	L 0–7	0–1–0 (0–1–0)
January 1	at Pittsburgh	Duquesne Garden • Pittsburgh, Pennsylvania	L 1–2	0–2–0 (0–2–0)
*Non-conference game.
