= 1909–10 Yale Bulldogs men's ice hockey season =

College ice hockey season

- Conference: IHA

Record
- Overall: 8–7–0
- Conference: 2–3–0
- Home: 1–0–0
- Road: 3–1–0
- Neutral: 4–6–0

Coaches and captains
- Captain: John Heron

The 1909–10 Yale Bulldogs men's ice hockey season was the 15th season of play for the program.

== Season ==
Yale recovered from a dismal season the year before but suffered from a lack of consistency, losing after nearly every win.

The team did not have a coach, however, Reginald Roome served as team manager.

== Roster ==
No.	Nat.	Player	Class	Pos	Height	Weight	DoB	Hometown	Previous team
	(United States)	Springer H. Brooks	Junior				1890-04-11	Saint Paul, Minnesota
	(United States)	Harold W. Carhart	Sophomore				1890-01-28	Brooklyn, New York
	(United States)	Seth French	Junior				1889-08-17	Newport, Rhode Island
		John Heron (C)	Senior	F
	(United States)	Arthur Howe	Sophomore				1890-03-03	South Orange, New Jersey
		James Johnson	Senior	D
	(United States)	Louis F. Loutrel	Junior	F			1890-06-15
		Stirling Martin	Senior	F
		Henry Merritt	Sophomore	F
	(United States)	Svante M. Swenson	Sophomore	D			1890-05-10	Manhattan, New York
		Earl Williams	Senior	G

== Standings ==
1909–10 Collegiate ice hockey standings
	Intercollegiate							Overall					
	GP	W	L	T	PCT.	GF	GA	GP	W	L	T	GF	GA
Amherst	–	–	–	–	–	–	–	6	4	2	0	–	–
Army	5	0	3	2	.200	1	8	6	0	4	2	1	12
Carnegie Tech	7	5	1	1	.786	27	8	7	5	1	1	27	8
Case	–	–	–	–	–	–	–	–	–	–	–	–	–
Columbia	6	0	5	1	.083	2	22	7	1	5	1	7	26
Cornell	7	3	4	0	.429	18	18	7	3	4	0	18	18
Dartmouth	5	1	4	0	.200	7	16	8	1	7	0	8	25
Harvard	6	5	1	0	.833	23	4	8	6	2	0	36	11
Massachusetts Agricultural	6	3	3	0	.500	10	18	7	4	3	0	12	19
MIT	5	3	2	0	.600	19	9	8	4	4	0	29	25
Norwich	–	–	–	–	–	–	–	–	–	–	–	–	–
Pennsylvania	1	1	0	0	1.000	1	0	2	2	0	0	6	0
Penn State	2	0	2	0	.000	1	9	2	0	2	0	1	9
Pittsburgh	4	1	2	1	.375	4	6	4	1	2	1	4	6
Princeton	9	7	2	0	.778	24	12	10	7	3	0	24	16
Rensselaer	3	1	2	0	.333	4	7	3	1	2	0	4	7
Springfield Training	–	–	–	–	–	–	–	–	–	–	–	–	–
Trinity	–	–	–	–	–	–	–	–	–	–	–	–	–
Union	–	–	–	–	–	–	–	1	0	1	0	–	–
Wesleyan	–	–	–	–	–	–	–	–	–	–	–	–	–
Western Reserve	–	–	–	–	–	–	–	–	–	–	–	–	–
Williams	5	4	1	0	.800	28	8	7	6	1	0	39	12
Yale	14	8	6	0	.571	39	32	15	8	7	0	42	36

1909–10 Intercollegiate Hockey Association standings
	Conference								Overall					
	GP	W	L	T	PTS	GF	GA		GP	W	L	T	GF	GA
Princeton *	5	5	0	0	1.000	12	2		10	7	3	0	24	16
Harvard	5	4	1	0	.800	19	3		8	6	2	0	36	11
Cornell	4	2	2	0	.500	10	8	†	7	3	4	0	18	18
Yale	5	2	3	0	.400	12	12		15	8	7	0	42	36
Dartmouth	4	1	3	0	.250	7	15	†	8	1	7	0	8	25
Columbia	5	0	5	0	.000	2	22		7	1	5	1	7	26
* indicates conference champion † A game between Cornell and Dartmouth was suspended and later cancelled due to poor ice conditions

== Schedule and results ==
Date	Opponent	Site	Result	Record
Regular season
December 28	at Carnegie Tech*	Duquesne Garden • Pittsburgh, Pennsylvania	W 4–1	1–0–0
December 29	vs. Princeton*	Duquesne Garden • Pittsburgh, Pennsylvania	L 1–2	1–1–0
December 30	vs. Princeton*	Duquesne Garden • Pittsburgh, Pennsylvania	W 2–1	2–1–0
December 31	vs. Princeton*	Duquesne Garden • Pittsburgh, Pennsylvania	L 2–5	2–2–0
January 1	vs. Cornell*	Elysium Arena • Cleveland, Ohio	W 5–3	3–2–0
January 2	vs. Cornell*	Elysium Arena • Cleveland, Ohio	W 4–2	4–2–0
January 4	vs. Cornell*	Elysium Arena • Cleveland, Ohio	L 1–3	4–3–0
January 15	at Amherst*	Pratt Field Rink • Amherst, Massachusetts	W 5–3	5–3–0
January 26	vs. Princeton	St. Nicholas Rink • New York, New York	L 1–2	5–4–0 (0–1–0)
February 2	MIT*	New Haven Lawn Club • New Haven, Connecticut	W 3–0	6–4–0
February 5	vs. Cornell	St. Nicholas Rink • New York, New York	L 1–3	6–5–0 (0–2–0)
February 10	at Columbia	St. Nicholas Rink • New York, New York	W 5–1	7–5–0 (1–2–0)
February 12	at St. Paul's School*	St. Paul's Rink • Concord, New Hampshire	L 3–4	7–6–0
February 16	vs. Dartmouth	St. Nicholas Rink • New York, New York	W 5–3	8–6–0 (2–2–0)
February 19	vs. Harvard	St. Nicholas Rink • New York, New York (Rivalry)	L 0–3	8–7–0 (2–3–0)
*Non-conference game.
