= 1909–10 Dartmouth men's ice hockey season =

- Conference: T–3rd IHA
- Home ice: Occom Pond

Record
- Overall: 1–7–0
- Conference: 1–3–0
- Road: 1–4–0
- Neutral: 0–3–0

Coaches and captains
- Head coach: Tom Hodge
- Captain: Ralph Marston

The 1909–10 Dartmouth men's ice hockey season was the 5th season of play for the program.

== Season ==
For its fifth season, Dartmouth played one of its worst years in team history. The Green lost their first seven games, only managing to win their final match, and scored a paltry 8 goals all season. A scheduled game against Cornell was postponed and later cancelled due to poor ice conditions. For the season Dartmouth had a new coach in Tom Hodge, a former defenseman with the Montreal Wanderers and the Montreal Hockey Club.

Note: Dartmouth College did not possess a moniker for its athletic teams until the 1920s, however, the university had adopted 'Dartmouth Green' as its school color in 1866.

== Roster ==
No.	Nat.	Player	Class	Pos	Height	Weight	DoB	Hometown	Previous team
		Gardner P. Bullard	Sophomore	G
		Arthur F. Doe	Graduate	F
	(United States)	Frederick C. Eaton	Junior	D				Auburndale, Massachusetts
	(United States)	Sargent F. Eaton	Junior	F			1888-10-23	Boston, Massachusetts
	(United States)	Ralph H. Marston (C)	Graduate	F				Roxbury, Massachusetts
		Newton	Sophomore	D
		Bradley M. Patten	Junior	F
		Chester N. Perry	Graduate	F			1887-05-20
		Henry W. Stucklen	Graduate	F
	(United States)	Carl S. Wells	Sophomore	F			1890-02-04	Natick, Massachusetts

== Standings ==
1909–10 Collegiate ice hockey standings
	Intercollegiate							Overall					
	GP	W	L	T	PCT.	GF	GA	GP	W	L	T	GF	GA
Amherst	–	–	–	–	–	–	–	6	4	2	0	–	–
Army	5	0	3	2	.200	1	8	6	0	4	2	1	12
Carnegie Tech	7	5	1	1	.786	27	8	7	5	1	1	27	8
Case	–	–	–	–	–	–	–	–	–	–	–	–	–
Columbia	6	0	5	1	.083	2	22	7	1	5	1	7	26
Cornell	7	3	4	0	.429	18	18	7	3	4	0	18	18
Dartmouth	5	1	4	0	.200	7	16	8	1	7	0	8	25
Harvard	6	5	1	0	.833	23	4	8	6	2	0	36	11
Massachusetts Agricultural	6	3	3	0	.500	10	18	7	4	3	0	12	19
MIT	5	3	2	0	.600	19	9	8	4	4	0	29	25
Norwich	–	–	–	–	–	–	–	–	–	–	–	–	–
Pennsylvania	1	1	0	0	1.000	1	0	2	2	0	0	6	0
Penn State	2	0	2	0	.000	1	9	2	0	2	0	1	9
Pittsburgh	4	1	2	1	.375	4	6	4	1	2	1	4	6
Princeton	9	7	2	0	.778	24	12	10	7	3	0	24	16
Rensselaer	3	1	2	0	.333	4	7	3	1	2	0	4	7
Springfield Training	–	–	–	–	–	–	–	–	–	–	–	–	–
Trinity	–	–	–	–	–	–	–	–	–	–	–	–	–
Union	–	–	–	–	–	–	–	1	0	1	0	–	–
Wesleyan	–	–	–	–	–	–	–	–	–	–	–	–	–
Western Reserve	–	–	–	–	–	–	–	–	–	–	–	–	–
Williams	5	4	1	0	.800	28	8	7	6	1	0	39	12
Yale	14	8	6	0	.571	39	32	15	8	7	0	42	36

1909–10 Intercollegiate Hockey Association standings
	Conference								Overall					
	GP	W	L	T	PTS	GF	GA		GP	W	L	T	GF	GA
Princeton *	5	5	0	0	1.000	12	2		10	7	3	0	24	16
Harvard	5	4	1	0	.800	19	3		8	6	2	0	36	11
Cornell	4	2	2	0	.500	10	8	†	7	3	4	0	18	18
Yale	5	2	3	0	.400	12	12		15	8	7	0	42	36
Dartmouth	4	1	3	0	.250	7	15	†	8	1	7	0	8	25
Columbia	5	0	5	0	.000	2	22		7	1	5	1	7	26
* indicates conference champion † A game between Cornell and Dartmouth was suspended and later cancelled due to poor ice conditions

== Schedule and results ==
Date	Opponent	Site	Result	Record
Regular Season
December 27	at Brae Burn Country Club*	Brae Burn Rink • Newton, Massachusetts	L 1–4	0–1–0
December 28	vs. Crescent Hockey Club*	Brae Burn Rink • Newton, Massachusetts	L 0–2	0–2–0
December 31	at Brae Burn Country Club*	Brae Burn Rink • Newton, Massachusetts	L 0–3	0–3–0
January 1	vs. MIT*	Brae Burn Rink • Newton, Massachusetts	L 0–1	0–4–0
January 12	vs. Princeton	St. Nicholas Rink • New York, New York	L 1–5	0–5–0 (0–1–0)
February 12	at Harvard	Harvard Stadium Rink • Boston, Massachusetts	L 0–5	0–6–0 (0–2–0)
February 16	at Yale	New Haven, Connecticut	L 3–5	0–7–0 (0–3–0)
February 17	at Columbia	St. Nicholas Rink • New York, New York	W 3–0	1–7–0 (1–3–0)
*Non-conference game.
