= 1909–10 Massachusetts Agricultural Aggies men's ice hockey season =

- Home ice: Campus Pond

Record
- Overall: 4–3–0
- Home: 4–1–0
- Road: 0–2–0

Coaches and captains
- Captain: Louis Brandt

The 1909–10 Massachusetts Agricultural Aggies men's ice hockey season was the 2nd season of play for the program.

== Season ==
Mass Agg's second season brought them their first winning campaign. The Aggies won 4 games against fellow small schools but the most outstanding game of the year was their 0–11 loss to Williams

== Roster ==
No.	Nat.	Player	Class	Pos	Height	Weight	DoB	Hometown	Previous team
		Arthur J. Ackerman	Sophomore
		James Adams
		Arnold Bentley
		Charlesworth Brewer	Freshman
		Louis Brandt (C)	Senior
		Curtis Peckham	Sophomore
		William C. Sanctuary	Sophomore				1888-10-16

== Standings ==
1909–10 Collegiate ice hockey standings
	Intercollegiate							Overall					
	GP	W	L	T	PCT.	GF	GA	GP	W	L	T	GF	GA
Amherst	–	–	–	–	–	–	–	6	4	2	0	–	–
Army	5	0	3	2	.200	1	8	6	0	4	2	1	12
Carnegie Tech	7	5	1	1	.786	27	8	7	5	1	1	27	8
Case	–	–	–	–	–	–	–	–	–	–	–	–	–
Columbia	6	0	5	1	.083	2	22	7	1	5	1	7	26
Cornell	7	3	4	0	.429	18	18	7	3	4	0	18	18
Dartmouth	5	1	4	0	.200	7	16	8	1	7	0	8	25
Harvard	6	5	1	0	.833	23	4	8	6	2	0	36	11
Massachusetts Agricultural	6	3	3	0	.500	10	18	7	4	3	0	12	19
MIT	5	3	2	0	.600	19	9	8	4	4	0	29	25
Norwich	–	–	–	–	–	–	–	–	–	–	–	–	–
Pennsylvania	1	1	0	0	1.000	1	0	2	2	0	0	6	0
Penn State	2	0	2	0	.000	1	9	2	0	2	0	1	9
Pittsburgh	4	1	2	1	.375	4	6	4	1	2	1	4	6
Princeton	9	7	2	0	.778	24	12	10	7	3	0	24	16
Rensselaer	3	1	2	0	.333	4	7	3	1	2	0	4	7
Springfield Training	–	–	–	–	–	–	–	–	–	–	–	–	–
Trinity	–	–	–	–	–	–	–	–	–	–	–	–	–
Union	–	–	–	–	–	–	–	1	0	1	0	–	–
Wesleyan	–	–	–	–	–	–	–	–	–	–	–	–	–
Western Reserve	–	–	–	–	–	–	–	–	–	–	–	–	–
Williams	5	4	1	0	.800	28	8	7	6	1	0	39	12
Yale	14	8	6	0	.571	39	32	15	8	7	0	42	36

== Schedule and results ==
Date	Opponent	Site	Result	Record
Regular Season
December 11	Northampton*	Campus Pond • Amherst, Massachusetts	W 2–1	1–0–0
January 8	Springfield Training*	Campus Pond • Amherst, Massachusetts	W 3–2	2–0–0
January 15	at Williams*	Cole Field House Pond • Williamstown, Massachusetts	L 0–11	2–1–0
January 28	Wesleyan*	Campus Pond • Amherst, Massachusetts	W 2–0	3–1–0
February 9	Amherst*	Campus Pond • Amherst, Massachusetts	W 3–1	4–1–0
February 12	Trinity*	Campus Pond • Amherst, Massachusetts	L 0–1	4–2–0
February 19	at Springfield Training*	Springfield, Massachusetts	L 2–3	4–3–0
*Non-conference game.
