= 1909–10 Williams Ephs men's ice hockey season =

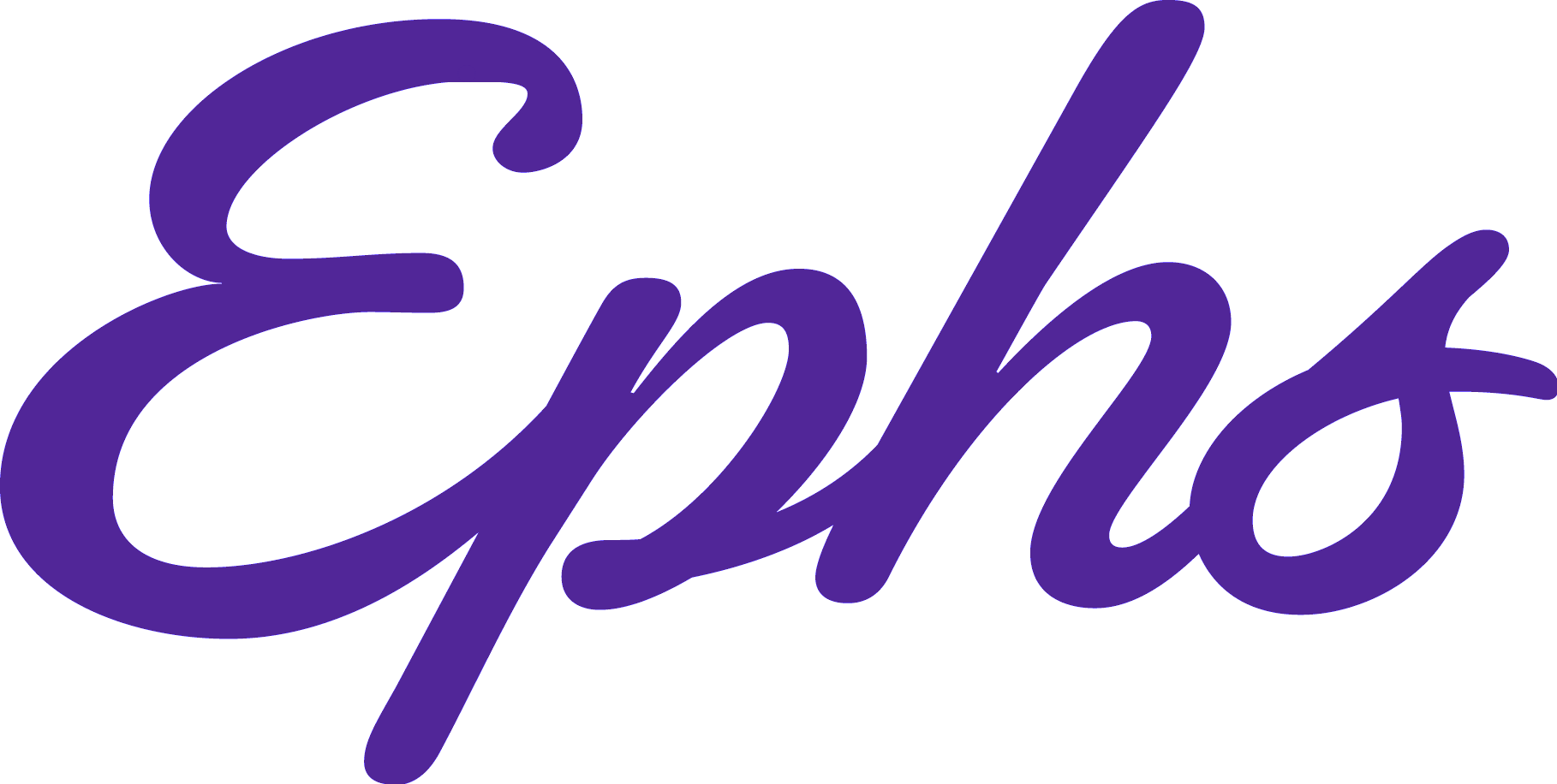
- Home ice: Cole Field House Pond

Record
- Overall: 6–1–0
- Home: 1–0–0
- Road: 3–1–0
- Neutral: 2–0–0

Coaches and captains

The 1909–10 Williams Ephs men's ice hockey season was the 7th season of play for the program.

== Season ==
After the mostly unsuccessful challenge to the IHA the year before, Williams only played one team from the top conference and surprisingly won the match. The Ephs continued to perform well over the course of the season, winning six of their seven games while playing only once at home. At the end of the season William's victory over Princeton could have given them a claim to the intercollegiate championship, however, Princeton played most of their games against top competition while Williams did not. The win also came in the preliminary time of the schedule when most teams weren't fully ready for play and thus was not given the same weight that a game later in the season would receive. In any event, Williams was able to claim a win over the 1910 Intercollegiate hockey champion, something very few small schools could even hope to accomplish.

== Roster ==
No.	Nat.	Player	Class	Pos	Height	Weight	DoB	Hometown	Previous team
		Stanley P. Benton	Senior	F			1887-10-20
		Charles W. Curtis	Sophomore	G
		Ely	Senior	F
		Frederick L. Hurlbutt	Freshman	F			1890-03-21
	(United States)	Sidney M. Michael	Freshman	D			1891-12-23	Buffalo, New York
	(United States)	J. Dudley Peterson	Junior	D			1887-10-30	Lockport, New York
		George W. VanGorder	Junior	F

== Standings ==
1909–10 Collegiate ice hockey standings
	Intercollegiate							Overall					
	GP	W	L	T	PCT.	GF	GA	GP	W	L	T	GF	GA
Amherst	–	–	–	–	–	–	–	6	4	2	0	–	–
Army	5	0	3	2	.200	1	8	6	0	4	2	1	12
Carnegie Tech	7	5	1	1	.786	27	8	7	5	1	1	27	8
Case	–	–	–	–	–	–	–	–	–	–	–	–	–
Columbia	6	0	5	1	.083	2	22	7	1	5	1	7	26
Cornell	7	3	4	0	.429	18	18	7	3	4	0	18	18
Dartmouth	5	1	4	0	.200	7	16	8	1	7	0	8	25
Harvard	6	5	1	0	.833	23	4	8	6	2	0	36	11
Massachusetts Agricultural	6	3	3	0	.500	10	18	7	4	3	0	12	19
MIT	5	3	2	0	.600	19	9	8	4	4	0	29	25
Norwich	–	–	–	–	–	–	–	–	–	–	–	–	–
Pennsylvania	1	1	0	0	1.000	1	0	2	2	0	0	6	0
Penn State	2	0	2	0	.000	1	9	2	0	2	0	1	9
Pittsburgh	4	1	2	1	.375	4	6	4	1	2	1	4	6
Princeton	9	7	2	0	.778	24	12	10	7	3	0	24	16
Rensselaer	3	1	2	0	.333	4	7	3	1	2	0	4	7
Springfield Training	–	–	–	–	–	–	–	–	–	–	–	–	–
Trinity	–	–	–	–	–	–	–	–	–	–	–	–	–
Union	–	–	–	–	–	–	–	1	0	1	0	–	–
Wesleyan	–	–	–	–	–	–	–	–	–	–	–	–	–
Western Reserve	–	–	–	–	–	–	–	–	–	–	–	–	–
Williams	5	4	1	0	.800	28	8	7	6	1	0	39	12
Yale	14	8	6	0	.571	39	32	15	8	7	0	42	36

== Schedule and results ==
Date	Opponent	Site	Result	Record
Regular Season
December 23	at Princeton*	St. Nicholas Rink • New York, New York	W 5–4	1–0–0
January 8	at Louden Field Club*	Empire Rink • Albany, New York	W 4–3	2–0–0
January 15	Massachusetts Agricultural*	Bleachery Pond • Williamstown, Massachusetts	W 11–0	3–0–0
January 29	vs. Rensselaer*	Empire Rink • Albany, New York	W 4–1	4–0–0
February 5	at Louden Field Club*	Empire Rink • Albany, New York	W 7–1	5–0–0
February 12	at Amherst*	Pratt Field Rink • Amherst, Massachusetts	L 1–2	5–1–0
February 19	Trinity*	Empire Rink • Albany, New York	W 7–1	6–1–0
*Non-conference game.
