= 1904–05 Yale Bulldogs men's ice hockey season =

College ice hockey season

- Conference: 2nd IHA

Record
- Overall: 5–4–0
- Conference: 3–1–0
- Road: 3–0–0
- Neutral: 2–4–0

Coaches and captains
- Captain: Rex Flinn

The 1904–05 Yale Bulldogs men's ice hockey season was the tenth season of play for the program.

== Season ==
Yale played a majority of their games at home for the first time in four years. Yale did not play any team from the Pittsburgh area for the first time since 1898 due to the collapse of the Western Pennsylvania Hockey League.

Yale entered the final game of its season with the opportunity to win the intercollegiate championship, however, Harvard once again stymied the Elis.

The team did not have a coach, however, Charles Goodyear II (the son of business magnate Charles W. Goodyear) served as team manager.

== Roster ==
No.	Nat.	Player	Class	Pos	Height	Weight	DoB	Hometown	Previous team
	(United States)	Karl Behr	Junior	F			1885-05-30	New York, New York
		Johnny Cornell	Junior	F
		Watson B. Day	Senior	G
		John Dilworth	Junior	F
	(United States)	Quentin F. Feitner	Sophomore	D			1885-04-19	Manhattan, New York
		A. Rex Flinn (C)	Junior	D
		Frederic Kay	Senior
		Fred Lang	Sophomore	G
		Bill Marcus	Junior	F
		Ralph Peverley	Junior	G
		Roger B. Shepard	Junior	F
	(United States)	Harold Stanley	Freshman	F			1885-10-02	Great Barrington, Massachusetts
		Paul R. Stinson	Graduate

== Standings ==
1904–05 Collegiate ice hockey standings
	Intercollegiate							Overall					
	GP	W	L	T	PCT.	GF	GA	GP	W	L	T	GF	GA
Army	1	1	0	0	1.000	6	2	8	7	1	0	23	7
Brown	4	0	4	0	.000	3	35	5	0	5	0	5	38
Columbia	4	2	2	0	.500	9	17	8	4	4	0	23	39
Harvard	6	6	0	0	1.000	65	9	10	10	0	0	97	16
MIT	2	0	2	0	.000	2	32	9	6	3	0	60	46
Polytechnic Institute of Brooklyn	–	–	–	–	–	–	–	–	–	–	–	–	–
Princeton	4	1	3	0	.250	15	18	6	1	4	1	15	32
Springfield Training	–	–	–	–	–	–	–	–	–	–	–	–	–
Yale	4	3	1	0	.750	30	14	9	5	4	0	37	29

1904–05 Intercollegiate Hockey Association standings
	Conference							Overall					
	GP	W	L	T	PTS	GF	GA	GP	W	L	T	GF	GA
Harvard *	4	4	0	0	8	33	7	10	10	0	0	97	16
Yale	4	3	1	0	6	30	14	9	5	4	0	37	29
Columbia	4	2	2	0	4	9	17	8	4	4	0	23	39
Princeton	4	1	3	0	2	15	18	6	1	4	1	15	32
Brown	4	0	4	0	0	3	35	5	0	5	0	5	38
* indicates conference champion

== Schedule and results ==
Date	Opponent	Site	Result	Record
Regular season
December 14	at New York Athletic Club*	St. Nicholas Rink • New York, New York	W 4–3	1–0–0
December 28	vs. Toronto*	Duquesne Garden • Pittsburgh, Pennsylvania	L 1–2	1–1–0
December 29	at Pittsburgh All-Scholastic Team*	Duquesne Garden • Pittsburgh, Pennsylvania	W 2–1	2–1–0
December 30	vs. Toronto*	Duquesne Garden • Pittsburgh, Pennsylvania	L 2–3	2–2–0
December 31	vs. Toronto*	Duquesne Garden • Pittsburgh, Pennsylvania	L 3–7	2–3–0
January 18	at Columbia	St. Nicholas Rink • New York, New York	W 9–3	3–3–0 (1–0–0)
January 28	vs. Brown	St. Nicholas Rink • New York, New York	W 11–0	4–3–0 (2–0–0)
January 31	vs. Yale Alumni*	New Haven, Connecticut (Exhibition)	L 6–9	
February 2	vs. Yale Alumni*	New Haven, Connecticut (Exhibition)	W 9–3	
February 11	vs. Princeton	St. Nicholas Rink • New York, New York	W 9–3	5–3–0 (3–0–0)
February 15	vs. Yale Alumni*	New Haven, Connecticut (Exhibition)	W 7–4	
February 18	vs. Harvard	St. Nicholas Rink • New York, New York (Rivalry)	L 1–7	5–4–0 (3–1–0)
*Non-conference game.
