= 1904–05 Brown men's ice hockey season =

- Conference: 5th IHA

Record
- Overall: 0–5–0
- Conference: 0–4–0
- Home: 0–2–0
- Road: 0–3–0

Coaches and captains
- Captain: Peter Chase

The 1904–05 Brown men's ice hockey season was the 8th season of play for the program.

== Season ==
The downward spiral for Brown's ice hockey team continued as they again won no games against college teams. This season brought a new low as the Brunos lost every game they played and established two program worsts; the 15 goals Brown surrendered to Harvard are the most goals against in the history of the program and the 14-goal deficit is the worst goal differential the program has ever seen (as of 2019).

== Roster ==
No.	Nat.	Player	Class	Pos	Height	Weight	DoB	Hometown	Previous team
		Winthrop Adams	Freshman	F
		Peter Chase (C)	Junior
		Frederic Cook	Senior
		Albert Harkness	Freshman
		Prescott Hill	Junior	G
	(United States)	Edgar Hopkins	Senior					Providence, Rhode Island
		Oliver Jennings	Sophomore
		Frederick Lane	Sophomore	F
		Leonard Little	Sophomore
		Stephen Lowe	Junior
		Frank Marble	Senior
		Robert Marble	Senior
		Harold Paine	Sophomore
		Homer Sweet	Sophomore	F

== Standings ==
1904–05 Collegiate ice hockey standings
	Intercollegiate							Overall					
	GP	W	L	T	PCT.	GF	GA	GP	W	L	T	GF	GA
Army	1	1	0	0	1.000	6	2	8	7	1	0	23	7
Brown	4	0	4	0	.000	3	35	5	0	5	0	5	38
Columbia	4	2	2	0	.500	9	17	8	4	4	0	23	39
Harvard	6	6	0	0	1.000	65	9	10	10	0	0	97	16
MIT	2	0	2	0	.000	2	32	9	6	3	0	60	46
Polytechnic Institute of Brooklyn	–	–	–	–	–	–	–	–	–	–	–	–	–
Princeton	4	1	3	0	.250	15	18	6	1	4	1	15	32
Springfield Training	–	–	–	–	–	–	–	–	–	–	–	–	–
Yale	4	3	1	0	.750	30	14	9	5	4	0	37	29

1904–05 Intercollegiate Hockey Association standings
	Conference							Overall					
	GP	W	L	T	PTS	GF	GA	GP	W	L	T	GF	GA
Harvard *	4	4	0	0	8	33	7	10	10	0	0	97	16
Yale	4	3	1	0	6	30	14	9	5	4	0	37	29
Columbia	4	2	2	0	4	9	17	8	4	4	0	23	39
Princeton	4	1	3	0	2	15	18	6	1	4	1	15	32
Brown	4	0	4	0	0	3	35	5	0	5	0	5	38
* indicates conference champion

== Schedule and results ==
Date	Opponent	Site	Result	Record
Regular Season
January 7	Hope High School*	Aldrich Field Rink • Providence, Rhode Island	L 2–3	0–1–0
January 11	vs. Princeton	St. Nicholas Rink • New York, New York	L 0–6	0–2–0 (0–1–0)
January 28	at Yale	St. Nicholas Rink • New York, New York	L 0–11	0–3–0 (0–2–0)
February 4	at Columbia	St. Nicholas Rink • New York, New York	L 2–3	0–4–0 (0–3–0)
February 8	at Harvard	Harvard Stadium Rink • Cambridge, Massachusetts	L 1–15	0–5–0 (0–4–0)
*Non-conference game.
