= 1904–05 Columbia men's ice hockey season =

- Conference: 3rd IHA
- Home ice: St. Nicholas Rink

Record
- Overall: 4–4–0
- Conference: 2–2–0
- Home: 4–2–0
- Road: 0–1–0
- Neutral: 0–1–0

Coaches and captains
- Captain: William Bode

The 1904–05 Columbia men's ice hockey season was the 9th season of play for the program.

== Season ==
The team did not have a head coach but E. H. Updike served as team manager.

Note: Columbia University adopted the Lion as its mascot in 1910.

== Roster ==
No.	Nat.	Player	Class	Pos	Height	Weight	DoB	Hometown	Previous team
		David Armstrong	Sophomore	F
		Guy Bates
		William Bode (C)	Senior	F
		William Callaghan	Graduate	F
		Douglas Carter
		Robert W. Ebling		G
		James Harrington	Junior	D
		Charles Jackson	Sophomore	D
		Arthur G. Lang		F
		Robert M. Miller	Sophomore	F
		Ralph B. Shoonmaker

== Standings ==
1904–05 Collegiate ice hockey standings
	Intercollegiate							Overall					
	GP	W	L	T	PCT.	GF	GA	GP	W	L	T	GF	GA
Army	1	1	0	0	1.000	6	2	8	7	1	0	23	7
Brown	4	0	4	0	.000	3	35	5	0	5	0	5	38
Columbia	4	2	2	0	.500	9	17	8	4	4	0	23	39
Harvard	6	6	0	0	1.000	65	9	10	10	0	0	97	16
MIT	2	0	2	0	.000	2	32	9	6	3	0	60	46
Polytechnic Institute of Brooklyn	–	–	–	–	–	–	–	–	–	–	–	–	–
Princeton	4	1	3	0	.250	15	18	6	1	4	1	15	32
Springfield Training	–	–	–	–	–	–	–	–	–	–	–	–	–
Yale	4	3	1	0	.750	30	14	9	5	4	0	37	29

1904–05 Intercollegiate Hockey Association standings
	Conference							Overall					
	GP	W	L	T	PTS	GF	GA	GP	W	L	T	GF	GA
Harvard *	4	4	0	0	8	33	7	10	10	0	0	97	16
Yale	4	3	1	0	6	30	14	9	5	4	0	37	29
Columbia	4	2	2	0	4	9	17	8	4	4	0	23	39
Princeton	4	1	3	0	2	15	18	6	1	4	1	15	32
Brown	4	0	4	0	0	3	35	5	0	5	0	5	38
* indicates conference champion

== Schedule and results ==
Date	Opponent	Site	Result	Record
Regular Season
December 3	vs. New York Hockey Club*	St. Nicholas Rink • New York, New York	L 2–13	0–1–0
December 13	Company K, 7th Regiment*	St. Nicholas Rink • New York, New York	W 3–1	1–1–0
December 16	Brooklyn Crescents*	St. Nicholas Rink • New York, New York	L 1–7	1–2–0
January 7	Princeton	St. Nicholas Rink • New York, New York	W 3–1	2–2–0 (1–0–0)
January 14	at Harvard	Harvard Stadium Rink • Boston, Massachusetts	L 0–5	2–3–0 (1–1–0)
January 18	Yale	St. Nicholas Rink • New York, New York	L 3–9	2–4–0 (1–2–0)
January 26	vs. Company K, 7th Regiment*	St. Nicholas Rink • New York, New York	W 8–1	3–4–0
February 4	Brown	St. Nicholas Rink • New York, New York	W 3–2	4–4–0 (2–2–0)
*Non-conference game.
