= 1904–05 Princeton Tigers men's ice hockey season =

College ice hockey season

- Conference: 4th IHA

Record
- Overall: 1–4–1
- Conference: 1–3–0
- Road: 0–2–1
- Neutral: 1–2–0

Coaches and captains
- Captain: Robert Leake

The 1904–05 Princeton Tigers men's ice hockey season was the 6th season of play for the program.

== Season ==
The Tigers played a program low of six games during the season and were only able to win one game against lowly Brown. The team would not play so few or win so few games until the season after World War I. Princeton played all of its games at the St. Nicholas Rink.

== Roster ==
No.	Nat.	Player	Class	Pos	Height	Weight	DoB	Hometown	Previous team
		Philip Chew	Sophomore	F
		John Chislett	Sophomore	G
		Francis Holland	Freshman	F
		Alfred King	Senior	D
		Robert Leake (C)	Senior	F
		Chester Levis	Sophomore	F
		Ewing Rafferty	Junior	D
		Frederick Winter	Freshman	F
		Afton Zahniser	Sophomore	D

== Standings ==
1904–05 Collegiate ice hockey standings
	Intercollegiate							Overall					
	GP	W	L	T	PCT.	GF	GA	GP	W	L	T	GF	GA
Army	1	1	0	0	1.000	6	2	8	7	1	0	23	7
Brown	4	0	4	0	.000	3	35	5	0	5	0	5	38
Columbia	4	2	2	0	.500	9	17	8	4	4	0	23	39
Harvard	6	6	0	0	1.000	65	9	10	10	0	0	97	16
MIT	2	0	2	0	.000	2	32	9	6	3	0	60	46
Polytechnic Institute of Brooklyn	–	–	–	–	–	–	–	–	–	–	–	–	–
Princeton	4	1	3	0	.250	15	18	6	1	4	1	15	32
Springfield Training	–	–	–	–	–	–	–	–	–	–	–	–	–
Yale	4	3	1	0	.750	30	14	9	5	4	0	37	29

1904–05 Intercollegiate Hockey Association standings
	Conference							Overall					
	GP	W	L	T	PTS	GF	GA	GP	W	L	T	GF	GA
Harvard *	4	4	0	0	8	33	7	10	10	0	0	97	16
Yale	4	3	1	0	6	30	14	9	5	4	0	37	29
Columbia	4	2	2	0	4	9	17	8	4	4	0	23	39
Princeton	4	1	3	0	2	15	18	6	1	4	1	15	32
Brown	4	0	4	0	0	3	35	5	0	5	0	5	38
* indicates conference champion

== Schedule and results ==
Date	Opponent	Site	Result	Record
Regular Season
December 10	at New York Wanderers*	St. Nicholas Rink • New York, New York	T 2–2	0–0–1
December 17	at New York Athletic Club*	St. Nicholas Rink • New York, New York	L 2–12	0–1–1
January 7	at Columbia	St. Nicholas Rink • New York, New York	L 1–3	0–2–1 (0–1–0)
January 11	vs. Brown	St. Nicholas Rink • New York, New York	W 6–0	1–2–1 (1–1–0)
January 21	vs. Harvard	St. Nicholas Rink • New York, New York	L 5–6 ^{OT}	1–3–1 (1–2–0)
February 13	vs. Yale	St. Nicholas Rink • New York, New York	L 3–9	1–4–1 (1–3–0)
*Non-conference game.
