= 1904–05 Harvard Crimson men's ice hockey season =

College ice hockey season

Intercollegiate Champion Intercollegiate Hockey Association, Champion
- Conference: 1st IHA
- Home ice: Harvard Stadium Rink

Record
- Overall: 10–0–0
- Conference: 4–0–0
- Home: 6–0–0
- Road: 2–0–0
- Neutral: 2–0–0

Coaches and captains
- Head coach: Alfred Winsor
- Captain: Trowbridge Callaway

The 1904–05 Harvard Crimson men's ice hockey season was the eighth season of play for the program.

== Season ==
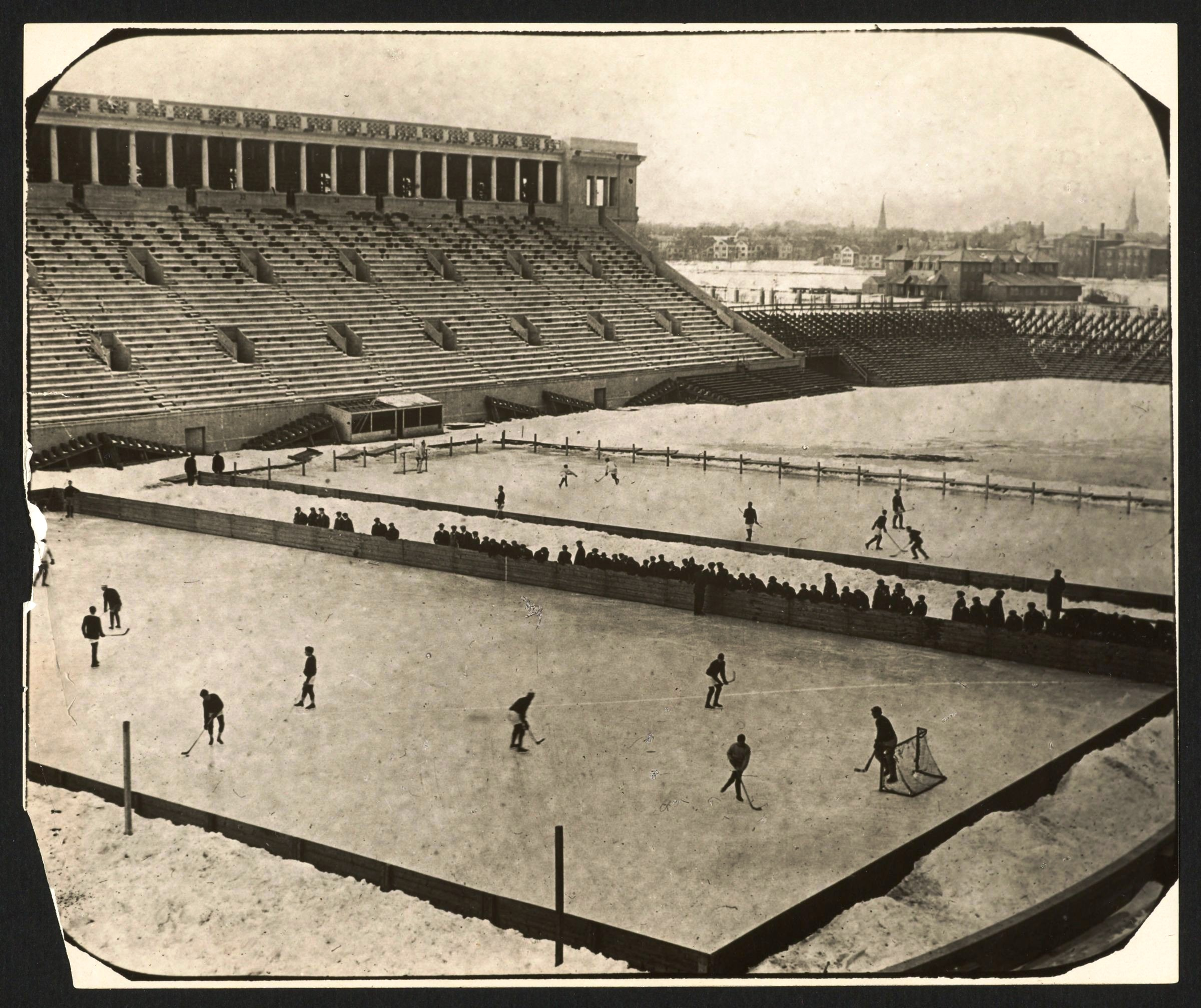
The two rinks at Harvard Stadium

In December 1904 Harvard constructed two rinks inside the recently completed Harvard Stadium, allowing for the increasingly popular ice hockey team to be viewed by a large number of spectators. The Crimson played six games at home during the year, utterly dominating their opponents; Harvard outscored the visitors 74–7 including setting an all-time program record (as of 2019) in their first intercollegiate game by eviscerating MIT 25–0. The game saw double hat-tricks from both Callaway and Wilder as well as a goal from MIT's Tylee...on his own net. In the 18–0 drubbing of Springfield, Richard Townsend set a program record with 8 goals in the game, a feat he almost duplicated with a 7-goal game against Brown.

For the third straight year Harvard finished undefeated, claiming another intercollegiate title, and extending their winning streak to 26 games.

== Roster ==
No.	Nat.	Player	Class	Pos	Height	Weight	DoB	Hometown	Previous team
	(United States)	Trowbridge Callaway (C)	Senior	D			1882-12-03	Chicago, Illinois
		Hatherly Foster		F
		Alexander Grant	Sophomore	F/D
		Malcolm Ivy	Graduate	G
	(United States)	John Manning	Graduate	G			1879-06-03	Boston, Massachusetts
		Eldon MacLeod	Junior	F			1883-03-18
	(United States)	Daniel Newhall	Junior	D			1884-12-03	Philadelphia, Pennsylvania
	(United States)	Clarence Pell	Freshman	F			1885-07-29	Newport, Rhode Island
		Laurence Rumsey	Freshman	F
		Rusell Sard	Senior	D
		William Tilden	Senior	G
	(United States)	Richard Townsend	Sophomore	F			1885-07-27	Roxbury, Massachusetts
		Enos Wilder	Junior	F
		David Wagstaff	Senior	F

== Standings ==
1904–05 Collegiate ice hockey standings
	Intercollegiate							Overall					
	GP	W	L	T	PCT.	GF	GA	GP	W	L	T	GF	GA
Army	1	1	0	0	1.000	6	2	8	7	1	0	23	7
Brown	4	0	4	0	.000	3	35	5	0	5	0	5	38
Columbia	4	2	2	0	.500	9	17	8	4	4	0	23	39
Harvard	6	6	0	0	1.000	65	9	10	10	0	0	97	16
MIT	2	0	2	0	.000	2	32	9	6	3	0	60	46
Polytechnic Institute of Brooklyn	–	–	–	–	–	–	–	–	–	–	–	–	–
Princeton	4	1	3	0	.250	15	18	6	1	4	1	15	32
Springfield Training	–	–	–	–	–	–	–	–	–	–	–	–	–
Yale	4	3	1	0	.750	30	14	9	5	4	0	37	29

1904–05 Intercollegiate Hockey Association standings
	Conference							Overall					
	GP	W	L	T	PTS	GF	GA	GP	W	L	T	GF	GA
Harvard *	4	4	0	0	8	33	7	10	10	0	0	97	16
Yale	4	3	1	0	6	30	14	9	5	4	0	37	29
Columbia	4	2	2	0	4	9	17	8	4	4	0	23	39
Princeton	4	1	3	0	2	15	18	6	1	4	1	15	32
Brown	4	0	4	0	0	3	35	5	0	5	0	5	38
* indicates conference champion

== Schedule and results ==
Date	Opponent	Site	Result	Record
Regular Season
December 17	Boston Hockey Club*	Harvard Stadium Rink • Boston, Massachusetts	W 8–6	1–0–0
December 21	Philips Academy*	Harvard Stadium Rink • Boston, Massachusetts	W 3–0	2–0–0
January 11	MIT*	Harvard Stadium Rink • Boston, Massachusetts	W 25–0	3–0–0
January 14	Columbia	Harvard Stadium Rink • Boston, Massachusetts	W 5–0	4–0–0 (1–0–0)
January 18	Springfield Training*	Harvard Stadium Rink • Boston, Massachusetts	W 18–0	5–0–0
January 21	vs. Princeton	St. Nicholas Rink • New York, New York	W 6–5 ^{OT}	6–0–0 (2–0–0)
February 8	Brown	Harvard Stadium Rink • Boston, Massachusetts	W 15–1	7–0–0 (3–0–0)
February 11	at St. Paul's School*	Concord, New Hampshire	W 3–1	8–0–0
February 13	at MIT*	Tech Rink • Boston, Massachusetts	W 7–2	9–0–0
February 18	vs. Yale	St. Nicholas Rink • New York, New York (Rivalry)	W 7–1	10–0–0 (4–0–0)
*Non-conference game.
