= 1904–05 MIT Engineers men's ice hockey season =

- Conference: Independent

Record
- Overall: 6–3–0

Coaches and captains
- Captain: Addison Miller

The 1904–05 MIT Engineers men's ice hockey season was the 6th season of play for the program.

== Season ==
After having to cancel their entire 1903–04 season due to poor weather conditions, MIT returned to the ice in January 1905. Unfortunately, the weather again forced them to cancel their first game of the season against Brown. When they did finally play a game, they came up against a juggernaut in Harvard and lost one of the most lopsided games in college hockey history (0–25). After that initial embarrassment the team settled down and won their next five games, albeit against non-college opponents.

The team did not have a head coach but P. S. Crowell served as team manager.

Note: Massachusetts Institute of Technology athletics were referred to as 'Engineers' or 'Techmen' during the first two decades of the 20th century. By 1920 all sports programs had adopted the Engineer moniker.

== Roster ==
| No. | Nat. | Player | Class | Pos | Height | Weight | DoB | Hometown | Previous team |
|---|---|---|---|---|---|---|---|---|---|
| | | George Coleman | Freshman | F |
| | | Joseph Coupal | Sophomore | F |
| | | Joseph Dwight | Junior |
| | | Winthrop Ford | Freshman | F |
| | | Gardner Gould | Sophomore | D |
| | | Addison Miller (C) | Sophomore | F |
| | | Benjamin Sharpe | Sophomore | G |
| | | Arthur Tylee | Sophomore |
| | | W. Elliot Weinz | Freshman |

== Standings ==
1904–05 Collegiate ice hockey standings
| | Intercollegiate | | | | | | | Overall | | | | | |
| | GP | W | L | T | PCT. | GF | GA | GP | W | L | T | GF | GA |
|---|---|---|---|---|---|---|---|---|---|---|---|---|---|
| Army | 1 | 1 | 0 | 0 | 1.000 | 6 | 2 | 8 | 7 | 1 | 0 | 23 | 7 |
| Brown | 4 | 0 | 4 | 0 | .000 | 3 | 35 | 5 | 0 | 5 | 0 | 5 | 38 |
| Columbia | 4 | 2 | 2 | 0 | .500 | 9 | 17 | 8 | 4 | 4 | 0 | 23 | 39 |
| Harvard | 6 | 6 | 0 | 0 | 1.000 | 65 | 9 | 10 | 10 | 0 | 0 | 97 | 16 |
| MIT | 2 | 0 | 2 | 0 | .000 | 2 | 32 | 9 | 6 | 3 | 0 | 60 | 46 |
| Polytechnic Institute of Brooklyn | – | – | – | – | – | – | – | – | – | – | – | – | – |
| Princeton | 4 | 1 | 3 | 0 | .250 | 15 | 18 | 6 | 1 | 4 | 1 | 15 | 32 |
| Springfield Training | – | – | – | – | – | – | – | – | – | – | – | – | – |
| Yale | 4 | 3 | 1 | 0 | .750 | 30 | 14 | 9 | 5 | 4 | 0 | 37 | 29 |

== Schedule and results ==
| Date | Opponent | Site | Result | Record |
Regular Season
| January 11 | at Harvard* | Harvard Stadium Rink • Boston, Massachusetts | L 0–25 | 0–1–0 |
| January 13 | DeMerritte School* | | W 16–0 | 1–1–0 |
| February 1 | Franklin Athletic Association* | | W 7–5 | 2–1–0 |
| February 2 | Mechanics Arts High School* | | W 14–1 | 3–1–0 |
| February 3 | Newton Squash Club* | | W 4–3 | 4–1–0 |
| February 4 | St. Mark's School* | | W 4–0 | 5–1–0 |
| February 6 | Brookline Country Club* | | L 4–5 | 5–2–0 |
| February 13 | Harvard* | Tech Rink • Boston, Massachusetts | L 2–7 | 5–3–0 |
| February 18 | Newton Squash Club* | Tech Rink • Boston, Massachusetts | W 9–0 | 6–3–0 |
*Non-conference game.
