= Lusk Reservoir =

- Location within New York
- Location: United States Military Academy, West Point, New York
- Coordinates: 41°23′15″N 73°57′45″W
- Type: reservoir
- Basin countries: United States
- Surface area: 12 acres (4.9 ha)
- Water volume: 78,000,000 US gal (300,000 m^{3})
- Surface elevation: 327 ft (100 m)

Lusk Reservoir is located next to Michie Stadium at the United States Military Academy at West Point. It is open for fishing in the Spring and early Fall, and usually freezes over during the winter months. The volume of the reservoir is required knowledge of all freshmen (plebes) at the Military Academy. It is one aspect of what is known as 'Academy Heritage'. When asked the question: "How many gallons in Lusk Reservoir?" plebes are expected to respond "78 million US gallons (300,000 m^{3}) when the water is flowing over the spillway." The proper answer had been 92.2 million US gallons (349,000 m^{3}) until construction of Michie Stadium reduced it to its current size. Its surface elevation is 327 feet (100 m) above sea level.

Prior to 1930, the school's ice hockey team used the reservoir as their home rink during the winter months. This practice was discontinued after the construction of the Smith Rink.

The reservoir was constructed by Captain James L. Lusk (USMA 1878) in 1895. In the spring of 2006, the dam underwent its first cleaning in 111 years by the US Army Corps of Engineers.

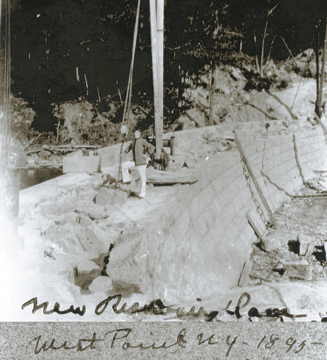
Under construction, 1895

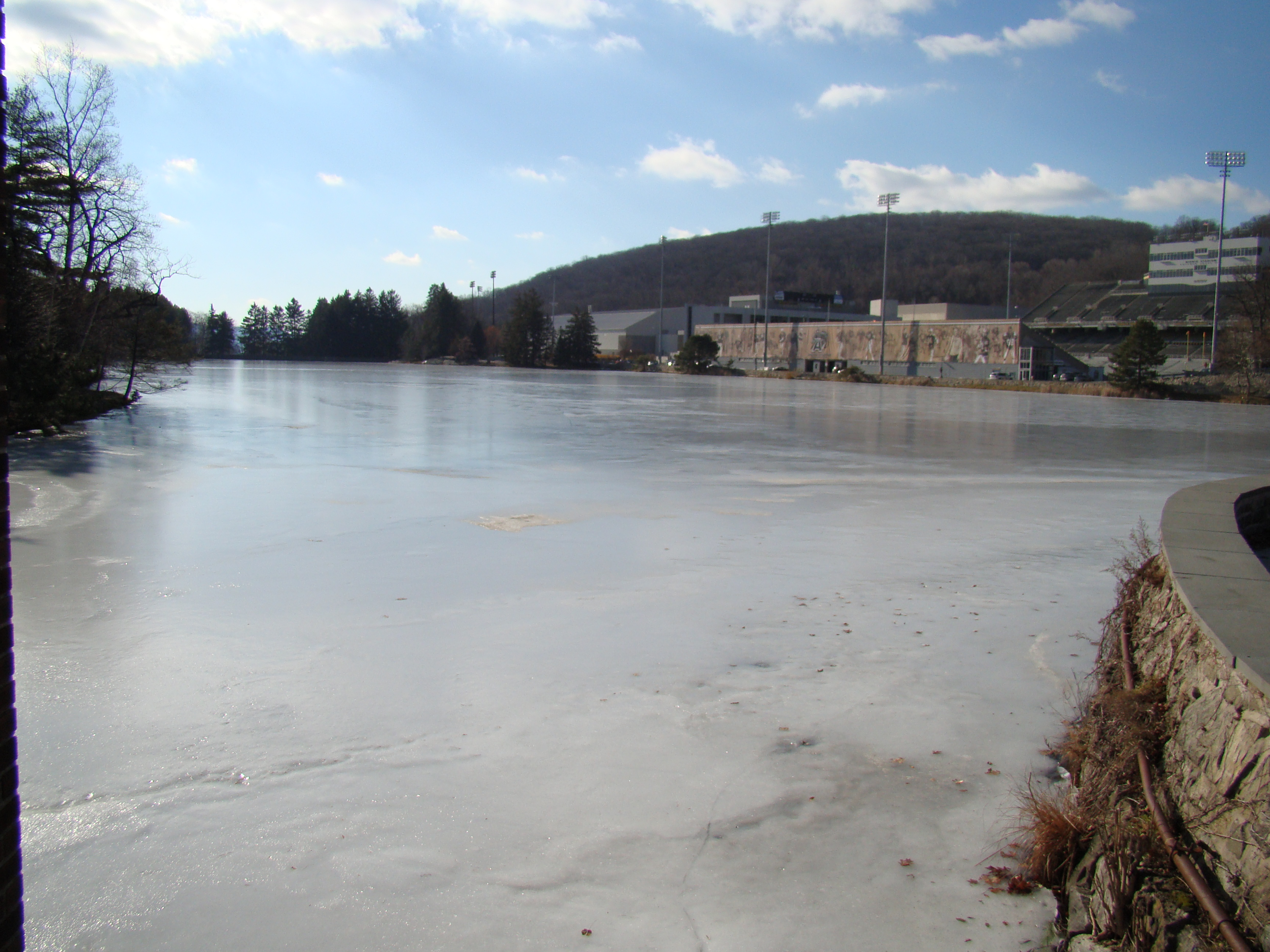
The lake frozen over, December 2008
