= 1908–09 Cornell Big Red men's ice hockey season =

- Home ice: Beebe Lake

Record
- Overall: 2–4–1
- Road: 0–2–0
- Neutral: 2–2–1

Coaches and captains
- Captain: Curtis Yohe

The 1908–09 Cornell Big Red men's ice hockey season was the 8th season of play for the program.

== Season ==
With an eye on joining the Intercollegiate Hockey Association, Cornell increased its slate of game once more, beginning the season with a three-game series against Pennsylvania, who were returning after an eight-year absence. The Big Red performed well, winning two and tying once, but they were unable to schedule any further games until the four weeks later when they went on another road trip. Their second sojourn went poorly as they were beaten in each of the three games and did not play particularly well in any.

In an effort to show their worth to the IHA committee, Cornell made a further road swing, with games scheduled against Dartmouth and Harvard. Despite several of the players being hurt or injured the Big Red played well against Dartmouth, losing 0–1, but the game against Harvard had to be called off due to poor ice conditions.

The team did not have a head coach but Jefferson Vincent served as team manager.

== Roster ==
No.	Nat.	Player	Class	Pos	Height	Weight	DoB	Hometown	Previous team
		Crawford
	(Canada)	Frank H. Crassweller	Sophomore	F			1887-10-13	Huron, Ontario
		Henry W. Ford	Sophomore	G
		Harold Jones	Junior	LW
	(United States)	Clarence V. Lally	Junior	D			1888-06-23	Cleveland, Ohio
	(United States)	Edmund B. Magner	Sophomore	C			1888-02-10	Kalamazoo, Michigan
		William W. Matchneer	Junior	D			1886-12-04
	(United States)	Albert D. Matthai	Junior	G			1887-08-23	Baltimore, Maryland
		Eugene L. Smith	Sophomore	D
	(United States)	Jefferson D. Vincent	Junior	RW			1888-05-03	Allegheny, Pennsylvania
	(United States)	Curtis M. Yohe (C)	Senior	R			1887-09-22	Connellsville, Pennsylvania

== Standings ==
1908–09 Collegiate ice hockey standings
	Intercollegiate							Overall					
	GP	W	L	T	PCT.	GF	GA	GP	W	L	T	GF	GA
Amherst	6	2	3	1	.417	7	14	6	2	3	1	7	14
Army	1	0	1	0	.000	1	2	2	0	1	1	2	3
Carnegie Tech	5	4	0	1	.900	15	4	8	5	2	1	17	8
Columbia	5	1	4	0	.200	12	27	5	1	4	0	12	27
Cornell	7	2	4	1	.357	17	21	7	2	4	1	17	21
Dartmouth	8	6	2	0	.750	24	11	14	11	3	0	47	23
Harvard	6	6	0	0	1.000	25	5	9	9	0	0	36	7
Massachusetts Agricultural	5	1	4	0	.200	6	10	6	2	4	0	12	10
MIT	5	2	2	1	.500	5	6	8	4	3	1	12	8
Pennsylvania	5	0	4	1	.100	3	17	6	0	5	1	5	21
Pittsburgh	4	1	2	1	.375	6	7	4	1	2	1	6	7
Polytechnic Institute of Brooklyn	–	–	–	–	–	–	–	–	–	–	–	–	–
Princeton	8	5	2	1	.688	26	15	11	7	3	1	33	21
Rensselaer	6	2	4	0	.333	13	20	6	2	4	0	13	20
Springfield Training	–	–	–	–	–	–	–	–	–	–	–	–	–
Trinity	–	–	–	–	–	–	–	–	–	–	–	–	–
Union	–	–	–	–	–	–	–	2	1	1	0	–	–
Williams	9	4	4	1	.500	33	26	9	4	4	1	33	26
Yale	10	4	5	1	.450	31	34	13	4	8	1	39	40

== Schedule and results ==
Date	Opponent	Site	Result	Record
Regular season
December 31	vs. Pennsylvania*	Elysium Arena • Cleveland, Ohio	T 2–2	0–0–1
January 1	vs. Pennsylvania*	Elysium Arena • Cleveland, Ohio	W 2–1	1–0–1
January 2	vs. Pennsylvania*	Elysium Arena • Cleveland, Ohio	W 6–0	2–0–1
January 28	vs. Williams*	Empire Rink • Albany, New York	L 2–8	2–1–1
January 29	at Rensselaer*	Empire Rink • Albany, New York	L 2–3	2–2–1
January 30	vs. Yale*	St. Nicholas Rink • New York, New York	L 3–6	2–3–1
February 5	at Dartmouth*	Hanover, New Hampshire	L 0–1	2–4–1
*Non-conference game.
