= 1908–09 RPI men's ice hockey season =

Ice hockey season

- Conference: Independent

Record
- Overall: 2–4–0
- Home: 2–2–0
- Road: 0–2–0

Coaches and captains
- Captain: Henry Stevenson

The 1908–09 RPI men's ice hockey season was the 6th season of play for the program.

== Season ==
Note: Rensselaer's athletic teams were unofficially known as 'Cherry and White' until 1921 when the Engineers moniker debuted for the men's basketball team.

== Roster ==
No.	Nat.	Player	Class	Pos	Height	Weight	DoB	Hometown	Previous team
		Allen Breed	Junior	LW
		Edward Dion	Freshman	G
		Burtner Fleeger		R
		Hamman		D
		Harding		LW
		Muller		D
		Henry Stevenson (C)		C

== Standings ==
1908–09 Collegiate ice hockey standings
	Intercollegiate							Overall					
	GP	W	L	T	PCT.	GF	GA	GP	W	L	T	GF	GA
Amherst	6	2	3	1	.417	7	14	6	2	3	1	7	14
Army	1	0	1	0	.000	1	2	2	0	1	1	2	3
Carnegie Tech	5	4	0	1	.900	15	4	8	5	2	1	17	8
Columbia	5	1	4	0	.200	12	27	5	1	4	0	12	27
Cornell	7	2	4	1	.357	17	21	7	2	4	1	17	21
Dartmouth	8	6	2	0	.750	24	11	14	11	3	0	47	23
Harvard	6	6	0	0	1.000	25	5	9	9	0	0	36	7
Massachusetts Agricultural	5	1	4	0	.200	6	10	6	2	4	0	12	10
MIT	5	2	2	1	.500	5	6	8	4	3	1	12	8
Pennsylvania	5	0	4	1	.100	3	17	6	0	5	1	5	21
Pittsburgh	4	1	2	1	.375	6	7	4	1	2	1	6	7
Polytechnic Institute of Brooklyn	–	–	–	–	–	–	–	–	–	–	–	–	–
Princeton	8	5	2	1	.688	26	15	11	7	3	1	33	21
Rensselaer	6	2	4	0	.333	13	20	6	2	4	0	13	20
Springfield Training	–	–	–	–	–	–	–	–	–	–	–	–	–
Trinity	–	–	–	–	–	–	–	–	–	–	–	–	–
Union	–	–	–	–	–	–	–	2	1	1	0	–	–
Williams	9	4	4	1	.500	33	26	9	4	4	1	33	26
Yale	10	4	5	1	.450	31	34	13	4	8	1	39	40

== Schedule and results ==
Date	Opponent	Site	Result	Record
Regular Season
December 24	at Carnegie Tech*	Duquesne Garden • Pittsburgh, Pennsylvania	L 1–4	0–1–0
December 25	at Carnegie Tech*	Duquesne Garden • Pittsburgh, Pennsylvania	L 1–4	0–2–0
January 8	Williams*	Empire Rink • Albany, New York	W 6–4	1–2–0
January 15	Columbia*	Empire Rink • Albany, New York	L 2–3	1–3–0
January 22	Yale*	Empire Rink • Albany, New York	L 0–3	1–4–0
January 29	Cornell*	Empire Rink • Albany, New York	W 3–2	2–4–0
*Non-conference game.
