= 1908–09 Harvard Crimson men's ice hockey season =

College ice hockey season

Intercollegiate Champion Intercollegiate Hockey Association, Champion
- Conference: 1st IHA
- Home ice: Harvard Stadium Rink

Record
- Overall: 9–0–0
- Conference: 4–0–0
- Home: 5–0–0
- Road: 1–0–0
- Neutral: 3–0–0

Coaches and captains
- Head coach: Alfred Winsor
- Captain: Joseph Willetts

The 1908–09 Harvard Crimson men's ice hockey season was the 12th season of play for the program.

== Season ==
After two season where they narrowly missed winning the Intercollegiate Hockey Association championship, Harvard returned to the top of the heap in 1909. The defense for the Crimson was stellar all season with the team surrendering just 7 goals in 9 games as they shut out opponents 5 times to earn the sixth undefeated season in the twelve years the program had existed.

For the first time since 1899 Harvard did not play its final game of the season against Yale.

== Roster ==
No.	Nat.	Player	Class	Pos	Height	Weight	DoB	Hometown	Previous team
	(United States)	Templeton Briggs	Senior	F			1887-02-09	Chestnut Hill, Massachusetts
	(United States)	Shirley Ford	Senior	D			1887-03-09	Sun River, Montana
	(United States)	George Gardner	Junior	F			1888-01-28	Boston, Massachusetts
	(United States)	S. Trafford Hicks	Junior	F			1888-04-04	Arlington, Massachusetts
	(United States)	Ralph Hornblower	Sophomore	F			1892-11-17	Arlington, Massachusetts
		Howard Leslie	Sophomore	F
	(United States)	William Morgan	Junior	F			1889-03-13	Short Hills, New Jersey
		John Paine	Senior	F
	(United States)	Thompson Sampson	Senior	D			1886-04-23	Boston, Massachusetts
	(United States)	Frank Washburn	Senior	G			1887-12-04	New York, New York
	(United States)	Joseph Willetts (C)	Senior	D			1886-10-17	Brooklyn, New York

== Standings ==
1908–09 Collegiate ice hockey standings
	Intercollegiate							Overall					
	GP	W	L	T	PCT.	GF	GA	GP	W	L	T	GF	GA
Amherst	6	2	3	1	.417	7	14	6	2	3	1	7	14
Army	1	0	1	0	.000	1	2	2	0	1	1	2	3
Carnegie Tech	5	4	0	1	.900	15	4	8	5	2	1	17	8
Columbia	5	1	4	0	.200	12	27	5	1	4	0	12	27
Cornell	7	2	4	1	.357	17	21	7	2	4	1	17	21
Dartmouth	8	6	2	0	.750	24	11	14	11	3	0	47	23
Harvard	6	6	0	0	1.000	25	5	9	9	0	0	36	7
Massachusetts Agricultural	5	1	4	0	.200	6	10	6	2	4	0	12	10
MIT	5	2	2	1	.500	5	6	8	4	3	1	12	8
Pennsylvania	5	0	4	1	.100	3	17	6	0	5	1	5	21
Pittsburgh	4	1	2	1	.375	6	7	4	1	2	1	6	7
Polytechnic Institute of Brooklyn	–	–	–	–	–	–	–	–	–	–	–	–	–
Princeton	8	5	2	1	.688	26	15	11	7	3	1	33	21
Rensselaer	6	2	4	0	.333	13	20	6	2	4	0	13	20
Springfield Training	–	–	–	–	–	–	–	–	–	–	–	–	–
Trinity	–	–	–	–	–	–	–	–	–	–	–	–	–
Union	–	–	–	–	–	–	–	2	1	1	0	–	–
Williams	9	4	4	1	.500	33	26	9	4	4	1	33	26
Yale	10	4	5	1	.450	31	34	13	4	8	1	39	40

1908–09 Intercollegiate Hockey Association standings
	Conference							Overall					
	GP	W	L	T	PTS	GF	GA	GP	W	L	T	GF	GA
Harvard *	4	4	0	0	8	14	3	9	9	0	0	36	7
Dartmouth	4	3	1	0	6	10	7	14	11	3	0	47	23
Yale	4	1	2	1	3	18	17	13	4	8	1	39	40
Princeton	4	1	2	1	3	14	13	11	7	3	1	33	21
Columbia	4	0	4	0	0	9	25	5	1	4	0	12	27
* indicates conference champion

== Schedule and results ==
Date	Opponent	Site	Result	Record
Regular Season
January 7	vs. MIT*	Brae Burn Rink • West Newton, Massachusetts	W 1–0	1–0–0
January 9	at Columbia	St. Nicholas Rink • New York, New York	W 5–1	2–0–0 (1–0–0)
January 13	Williams*	Harvard Stadium Rink • Cambridge, Massachusetts	W 9–2	3–0–0
January 16	vs. Princeton	St. Nicholas Rink • New York, New York	W 3–2	4–0–0 (2–0–0)
January 25	St. Francis Xavier*	Harvard Stadium Rink • Cambridge, Massachusetts	W 1–0	5–0–0
January 27	Laval*	Harvard Stadium Rink • Cambridge, Massachusetts	W 3–0	6–0–0
January 30	New York Wanderers*	Harvard Stadium Rink • Cambridge, Massachusetts	W 8–2	7–0–0
February 20	vs. Yale	St. Nicholas Rink • New York, New York (Rivalry)	W 5–0	8–0–0 (3–0–0)
February 22	vs. Dartmouth	Harvard Stadium Rink • Cambridge, Massachusetts	W 1–0	9–0–0 (4–0–0)
*Non-conference game.
