= 1908–09 Yale Bulldogs men's ice hockey season =

College ice hockey season

- Conference: T–3rd IHA

Record
- Overall: 4–8–1
- Conference: 1–2–1
- Road: 2–3–0
- Neutral: 2–5–1

Coaches and captains
- Captain: John Heron

The 1908–09 Yale Bulldogs men's ice hockey season was the 14th season of play for the program.

== Season ==
After winning the Intercollegiate championship in 1908, Yale wasn't able to sustain their high level of play and started the season flat, losing five of their first six games. They recovered a bit in the middle of their schedule, albeit against weaker opponents, but sagged at the end to finish four games below .500, their worst record in six years.

The team did not have a coach, however, R. Seldon Rose served as team manager.

== Roster ==
No.	Nat.	Player	Class	Pos	Height	Weight	DoB	Hometown	Previous team
	(United States)	Robert C. Deming	Sophomore	RW			1888-06-04	New Haven, Connecticut	Hopkins School
		Grover Fels	Senior	F			1885-10-09
	(United States)	Seth French	Sophomore	G			1889-08-17	Newport, Rhode Island
		John Heron (C)	Junior	F
		Henry Howe	Junior	G
		James Johnson	Junior	D
		Robert King	Senior	D
		Stirling Martin	Junior	F
	(United States)	Otis E. McIntyre	Junior	RW	5' 9" (1.75 m)	150 lb (68 kg)	1886-10-25	Colorado Springs, Colorado
		Neil Stevens	Junior	F
	(United States)	Francis Trudeau	Senior	G			1887-01-02	Saranac Lake, New York

== Standings ==
1908–09 Collegiate ice hockey standings
	Intercollegiate							Overall					
	GP	W	L	T	PCT.	GF	GA	GP	W	L	T	GF	GA
Amherst	6	2	3	1	.417	7	14	6	2	3	1	7	14
Army	1	0	1	0	.000	1	2	2	0	1	1	2	3
Carnegie Tech	5	4	0	1	.900	15	4	8	5	2	1	17	8
Columbia	5	1	4	0	.200	12	27	5	1	4	0	12	27
Cornell	7	2	4	1	.357	17	21	7	2	4	1	17	21
Dartmouth	8	6	2	0	.750	24	11	14	11	3	0	47	23
Harvard	6	6	0	0	1.000	25	5	9	9	0	0	36	7
Massachusetts Agricultural	5	1	4	0	.200	6	10	6	2	4	0	12	10
MIT	5	2	2	1	.500	5	6	8	4	3	1	12	8
Pennsylvania	5	0	4	1	.100	3	17	6	0	5	1	5	21
Pittsburgh	4	1	2	1	.375	6	7	4	1	2	1	6	7
Polytechnic Institute of Brooklyn	–	–	–	–	–	–	–	–	–	–	–	–	–
Princeton	8	5	2	1	.688	26	15	11	7	3	1	33	21
Rensselaer	6	2	4	0	.333	13	20	6	2	4	0	13	20
Springfield Training	–	–	–	–	–	–	–	–	–	–	–	–	–
Trinity	–	–	–	–	–	–	–	–	–	–	–	–	–
Union	–	–	–	–	–	–	–	2	1	1	0	–	–
Williams	9	4	4	1	.500	33	26	9	4	4	1	33	26
Yale	10	4	5	1	.450	31	34	13	4	8	1	39	40

1908–09 Intercollegiate Hockey Association standings
	Conference							Overall					
	GP	W	L	T	PTS	GF	GA	GP	W	L	T	GF	GA
Harvard *	4	4	0	0	8	14	3	9	9	0	0	36	7
Dartmouth	4	3	1	0	6	10	7	14	11	3	0	47	23
Yale	4	1	2	1	3	18	17	13	4	8	1	39	40
Princeton	4	1	2	1	3	14	13	11	7	3	1	33	21
Columbia	4	0	4	0	0	9	25	5	1	4	0	12	27
* indicates conference champion

== Schedule and results ==
Date	Opponent	Site	Result	Record
Regular season
December 14	at New York Wanderers*	St. Nicholas Rink • New York, New York	L 3–4	0–1–0
December 30	at Pittsburgh*	Duquesne Garden • Pittsburgh, Pennsylvania	W 4–2	1–1–0
December 31	vs. Princeton*	Duquesne Garden • Pittsburgh, Pennsylvania	L 0–2	1–2–0
January 1	vs. Princeton*	Duquesne Garden • Pittsburgh, Pennsylvania	L 0–1	1–3–0
January 2	vs. Princeton*	Duquesne Garden • Pittsburgh, Pennsylvania	L 0–4	1–4–0
January 14	vs. Dartmouth	St. Nicholas Rink • New York, New York	L 2–3	1–5–0 (0–1–0)
January 22	vs. Rensselaer*	Empire Rink • Albany, New York	W 3–2	2–5–0
January 23	at Louden Field Club*	Empire Rink • Albany, New York	L 2–3	2–6–0
January 30	vs. Cornell*	St. Nicholas Rink • New York, New York	W 6–3	3–6–0
February 2	at Columbia	St. Nicholas Rink • New York, New York	W 11–4	4–6–0 (1–1–0)
February 6	at New York Wanderers*	St. Nicholas Rink • New York, New York	L 2–3	4–7–0
February 13	vs. Princeton	St. Nicholas Rink • New York, New York	T 5–5 ^{OT}	4–7–1 (1–1–1)
February 20	vs. Harvard	St. Nicholas Rink • New York, New York (Rivalry)	L 0–5	4–8–1 (1–2–1)
*Non-conference game.
