= 1908–09 Massachusetts Agricultural Aggies men's ice hockey season =

- Home ice: Campus Pond

Record
- Overall: 2–4–0
- Home: 2–1–0
- Road: 0–2–0
- Neutral: 0–1–0

Coaches and captains
- Captain: Louis Brandt

The 1908–09 Massachusetts Agricultural Aggies men's ice hockey season was the inaugural season of play for the program.

== Season ==
The Aggies began their season hardly well, shutting out opponents in consecutive games, but after a damning loss to Springfield Training the team flagged in their final three games, losing all while not being able to score a goal.

== Roster ==
No.	Nat.	Player	Class	Pos	Height	Weight	DoB	Hometown	Previous team
		Arthur J. Ackerman	Freshman
		Louis Brandt (C)	Junior
		Elmer Hathaway	Senior
		Thomas Hemenway	Freshman
		Edward Norris	Freshman
		Curtis Peckham	Freshman
		William C. Sanctuary	Freshman				1888-10-16

== Standings ==
1908–09 Collegiate ice hockey standings
	Intercollegiate							Overall					
	GP	W	L	T	PCT.	GF	GA	GP	W	L	T	GF	GA
Amherst	6	2	3	1	.417	7	14	6	2	3	1	7	14
Army	1	0	1	0	.000	1	2	2	0	1	1	2	3
Carnegie Tech	5	4	0	1	.900	15	4	8	5	2	1	17	8
Columbia	5	1	4	0	.200	12	27	5	1	4	0	12	27
Cornell	7	2	4	1	.357	17	21	7	2	4	1	17	21
Dartmouth	8	6	2	0	.750	24	11	14	11	3	0	47	23
Harvard	6	6	0	0	1.000	25	5	9	9	0	0	36	7
Massachusetts Agricultural	5	1	4	0	.200	6	10	6	2	4	0	12	10
MIT	5	2	2	1	.500	5	6	8	4	3	1	12	8
Pennsylvania	5	0	4	1	.100	3	17	6	0	5	1	5	21
Pittsburgh	4	1	2	1	.375	6	7	4	1	2	1	6	7
Polytechnic Institute of Brooklyn	–	–	–	–	–	–	–	–	–	–	–	–	–
Princeton	8	5	2	1	.688	26	15	11	7	3	1	33	21
Rensselaer	6	2	4	0	.333	13	20	6	2	4	0	13	20
Springfield Training	–	–	–	–	–	–	–	–	–	–	–	–	–
Trinity	–	–	–	–	–	–	–	–	–	–	–	–	–
Union	–	–	–	–	–	–	–	2	1	1	0	–	–
Williams	9	4	4	1	.500	33	26	9	4	4	1	33	26
Yale	10	4	5	1	.450	31	34	13	4	8	1	39	40

== Schedule and results ==
Date	Opponent	Site	Result	Record
Regular Season
December 12	Springfield Training*	Campus Pond • Amherst, Massachusetts	W 2–0	1–0–0
January 8	YMCA*	Campus Pond • Amherst, Massachusetts	W 6–0	2–0–0
January 27	at Springfield Training*	Springfield, Massachusetts	L 4–5	2–1–0
January 30	at Amherst*	Amherst, Massachusetts	L 0–3	2–2–0
February 5	vs. MIT*	Brae Burn Rink • Newton, Massachusetts	L 0–1	2–3–0
February 27	Trinity*	Campus Pond • Amherst, Massachusetts	L 0–1	2–4–0
*Non-conference game.
