= 1908–09 Dartmouth men's ice hockey season =

- Conference: 2nd IHA
- Home ice: Occom Pond

Record
- Overall: 11–3–0
- Conference: 3–1–0
- Home: 2–1–0
- Road: 7–1–0
- Neutral: 2–1–0

Coaches and captains
- Head coach: John Eames
- Captain: Stanley Leighton

The 1908–09 Dartmouth men's ice hockey season was the 4th season of play for the program.

== Season ==
After sagging to the bottom of the college hockey ranks in 1908 Dartmouth responded by hiring its first head coach. Though John Eames would only last one year behind the bench, the team responded well and finished with a team-record 11 wins. The Green would not reach double-digit wins again until 1923.

Note: Dartmouth College did not possess a moniker for its athletic teams until the 1920s, however, the university had adopted 'Dartmouth Green' as its school color in 1866.

== Roster ==
No.	Nat.	Player	Class	Pos	Height	Weight	DoB	Hometown	Previous team
		Arthur F. Doe	Senior	F
	(United States)	Sargent F. Eaton	Sophomore	F			1888-10-23	Boston, Massachusetts
		Emile H. Erhard	Senior	G
	(United States)	Stanley W. Leighton (C)	Senior	D				Boston, Massachusetts
	(United States)	Ralph H. Marston	Senior	F				Roxbury, Massachusetts
		Bradley M. Patten	Sophomore	F
		Chester N. Perry	Senior	F			1887-05-20
	(United States)	Russell A. Pettengill	Senior	D			1888-02-27	Melrose, Massachusetts
		Henry W. Stucklen	Senior	F

== Standings ==
1908–09 Collegiate ice hockey standings
	Intercollegiate							Overall					
	GP	W	L	T	PCT.	GF	GA	GP	W	L	T	GF	GA
Amherst	6	2	3	1	.417	7	14	6	2	3	1	7	14
Army	1	0	1	0	.000	1	2	2	0	1	1	2	3
Carnegie Tech	5	4	0	1	.900	15	4	8	5	2	1	17	8
Columbia	5	1	4	0	.200	12	27	5	1	4	0	12	27
Cornell	7	2	4	1	.357	17	21	7	2	4	1	17	21
Dartmouth	8	6	2	0	.750	24	11	14	11	3	0	47	23
Harvard	6	6	0	0	1.000	25	5	9	9	0	0	36	7
Massachusetts Agricultural	5	1	4	0	.200	6	10	6	2	4	0	12	10
MIT	5	2	2	1	.500	5	6	8	4	3	1	12	8
Pennsylvania	5	0	4	1	.100	3	17	6	0	5	1	5	21
Pittsburgh	4	1	2	1	.375	6	7	4	1	2	1	6	7
Polytechnic Institute of Brooklyn	–	–	–	–	–	–	–	–	–	–	–	–	–
Princeton	8	5	2	1	.688	26	15	11	7	3	1	33	21
Rensselaer	6	2	4	0	.333	13	20	6	2	4	0	13	20
Springfield Training	–	–	–	–	–	–	–	–	–	–	–	–	–
Trinity	–	–	–	–	–	–	–	–	–	–	–	–	–
Union	–	–	–	–	–	–	–	2	1	1	0	–	–
Williams	9	4	4	1	.500	33	26	9	4	4	1	33	26
Yale	10	4	5	1	.450	31	34	13	4	8	1	39	40

1908–09 Intercollegiate Hockey Association standings
	Conference							Overall					
	GP	W	L	T	PTS	GF	GA	GP	W	L	T	GF	GA
Harvard *	4	4	0	0	8	14	3	9	9	0	0	36	7
Dartmouth	4	3	1	0	6	10	7	14	11	3	0	47	23
Yale	4	1	2	1	3	18	17	13	4	8	1	39	40
Princeton	4	1	2	1	3	14	13	11	7	3	1	33	21
Columbia	4	0	4	0	0	9	25	5	1	4	0	12	27
* indicates conference champion

== Schedule and results ==
Date	Opponent	Site	Result	Record
Regular Season
December 19	Springfield Training*	Occom Pond • Durham, New Hampshire	W 9–1	1–0–0
December 27	at Brae Burn Country Club*	Brae Burn Rink • Newton, Massachusetts	W 5–2	2–0–0
December 29	at Dorchester Athletic Association*	Brae Burn Rink • Newton, Massachusetts	W 4–1	3–0–0
December 30	at Brae Burn Country Club*	Brae Burn Rink • Newton, Massachusetts	W 3–1	4–0–0
January 1	at Crescent Hockey Club*	Brae Burn Rink • Newton, Massachusetts	W 4–1	5–0–0
January 2	vs. Winchester Country Club*	Brae Burn Rink • Newton, Massachusetts	W 5–0	6–0–0
January 4	vs. MIT*	Brae Burn Rink • Newton, Massachusetts	L 1–2	6–1–0
January 9	McGill*	Occom Pond • Hanover, New Hampshire	L 2–7	6–2–0
January 14	vs. Yale	St. Nicholas Rink • New York, New York	W 3–2	7–2–0 (1–0–0)
January 16	at Williams*	Cole Field House Pond • Williamstown, Massachusetts	W 3–2	8–2–0
January 20	at Columbia	St. Nicholas Rink • New York, New York	W 4–2 ^{OT}	9–2–0 (2–0–0)
January 22	vs. Princeton	St. Nicholas Rink • New York, New York	W 3–2	10–2–0 (3–0–0)
February 5	Cornell*	Occom Pond • Hanover, New Hampshire	W 1–0	11–2–0
February 22	at Harvard	Harvard Stadium Rink • Boston, Massachusetts	L 0–1	11–3–0 (3–1–0)
*Non-conference game.
