= Philip Hayes (United States Army officer) =

United States Army general

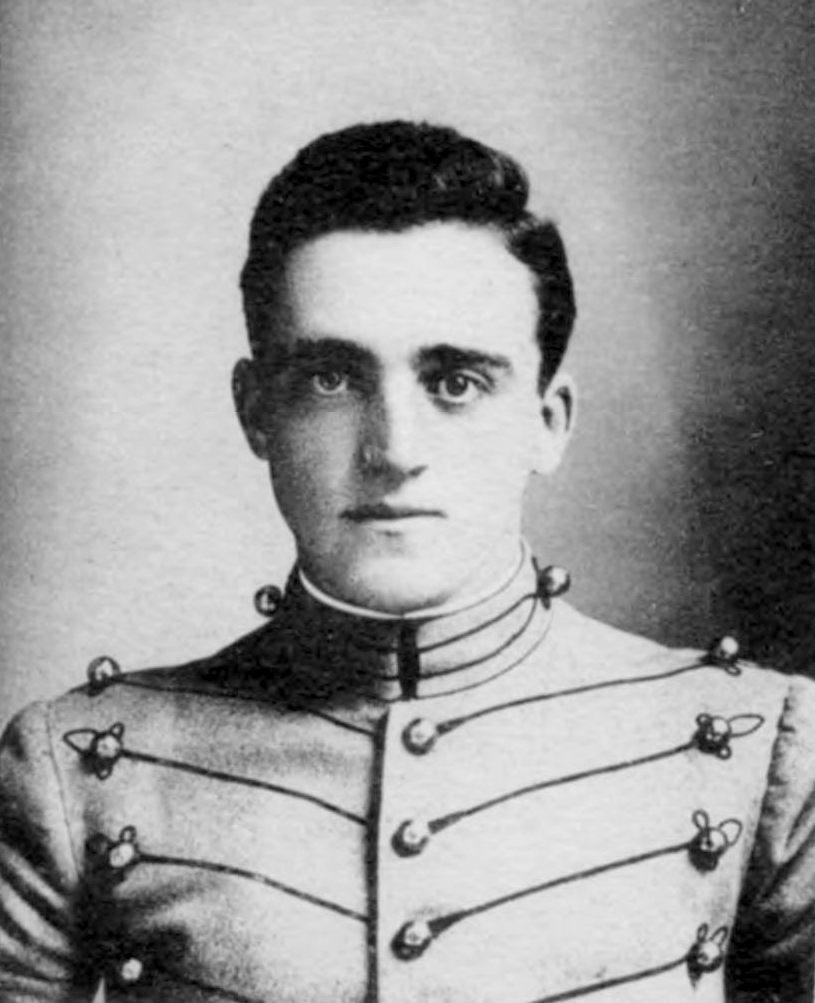
- At West Point in 1909
- Born: June 16, 1887; Portage, Wisconsin, United States
- Died: November 25, 1949 (aged 62); Washington, D.C., United States
- Military career
- Allegiance: United States of America
- Branch: United States Army
- Service years: 1909–1946
- Rank: Major general
- Commands: Third Service Command
- Conflicts: World War I World War II
- Awards: Army Distinguished Service Medal; Legion of Merit

Philip Hayes (June 16, 1887 – November 25, 1949) was a major-general in the U.S. Army. He was the commander of the Third Service Command from 1943 to 1946. Hayes was in charge of the U.S. military's takeover, under the authority of the Smith-Connally Act, of the Philadelphia Transportation Company in August 1944 that brought to an end the Philadelphia transit strike of 1944. Earlier in his career, Hayes served as the chief of staff to Gen. Walter Short, who was the commander of the Hawaiian Department at the time of the Pearl Harbor attack, although Hayes was rotated from Hawaii back to the mainland in November 1941, shortly before the attack.

== Early life, education and early military career ==
Philip Hayes was born on June 16, 1887, in Portage, Wisconsin. He graduated from West Point in 1909, was commissioned into the Army there as a second lieutenant and remained at West Point as an instructor after graduation. He was later transferred to the field artillery and served in the Philippines during World War I. Given a field promotion to a temporary rank of Lt. Colonel during the war, Hayes reverted to his permanent rank of Captain after World War I ended. In 1919 he returned to West Point, first as an exchange officer and then as executive officer for athletics.

Philip Hayes was promoted to the rank of Major in July 1920. He then served as executive officer of the 76th Field Artillery Division at Camp Lewis, Washington. In 1920s he held a number of executive posts and attended officer's school. After a one-year course of study, Hayes graduated from the Army War College at Washington Barracks in 1930.

== Main military career ==
Hayes attained the rank of Lt. Colonel in March 1934. In 1936 he was transferred to Hawaii and became an assistant chief of staff at the Army's Hawaiian Department. In July 1938 Hayes was promoted to the rank of Colonel and he became the chief of staff of the Hawaiian Department in 1940.

While serving as the chief of staff of the Hawaiian Department, Hayes warned of the possibility of a sneak attack on Pearl Harbor by Japan. In standing orders to the department, Hayes wrote: "It is possible that a declaration of war upon the United States may be preceded by a surprise raid or attack on the Pearl Harbor Naval Base by hostile aircraft, submarines, or surface ships".

Hayes was transferred back to the mainland in late November 1941, due to a scheduled rotation, and stationed at Fort Bragg.

From December 1941 to March 1942 Hayes briefly served as the professor of Military Science and Tactics at Harvard University. After leaving Harvard, Hayes served as the chief of staff of Army's First Service Command.

On June 22, 1943, Hayes was promoted to brigadier general. He served as deputy chief of staff of all Army Service Commands and, effective December 1, 1943, was appointed the head of the Third Service Command, covering Maryland, Pennsylvania and Virginia. In January 1944 Philip Hayes was promoted to the two-star rank of major general, with the U.S. Senate confirming his promotion on January 27, 1944.

As head of the Third Service Command, Hayes oversaw much of the logistics related to the war production in the Maryland-Pennsylvania-Virginia area; this included having to deal with a thorny issue of employment of prisoner of war, where the U.S. laws and the restrictions of the Geneva Convention were difficult to reconcile.

On August 3, 1944, under the provisions of the Smith-Connally Act, President Franklin Roosevelt signed an order authorizing the U.S. military's takeover of the Philadelphia Transportation Company. The order was prompted by a massive sickout strike by the white transit workers protesting the decision to allow black transit employees to hold non-menial jobs, such as streetcar motormen and conductors. The strike paralyzed the public transportation system in Philadelphia and significantly disrupted the war production in the city. General Hayes was put in charge of the military seizure of the Philadelphia Transit Company. He acted decisively and brought the strike to an end within a few days. After brief negotiations, Hayes issued an ultimatum on August 5 that those strikers who would not return to work by August 7, would be fired and refused the War Manpower Commission job availability certificates for the duration of the war, and that those between ages of 18 and 37 would also lose their military draft deferments. The strike was over by August 7 and the situation quickly returned to normal; the city of Philadelphia avoided a major outbreak of racial violence that had been feared by many at the start of the strike. For his role in quickly bringing the Philadelphia strike to an end, Gen. Hayes was later awarded a Legion of Merit.

Hayes was awarded the Army Distinguished Service Medal in November 1945 for "his sustained efforts to maintain the flow of labor to factories and war industries and to expedite the supply of essential materials during a most critical period" of World War II.

== Retirement and later years ==
Gen. Hayes retired from the military in January 1946.

After retirement he held a number of public service, business and charitable posts. In 1946 Hayes was appointed chairman of Maryland's State Aviation Commission. Hayes was also active in a number of cancer charities.

Hayes suffered a stroke on November 9, 1949 and died on November 25, 1949, at the Walter Reed hospital in Washington.

== See also ==
- Pearl Harbor attack
- Philadelphia transit strike of 1944
