= 1908–09 Pittsburgh men's ice hockey season =

- Home ice: Duquesne Garden

Record
- Overall: 1–2–1
- Conference: 1–2–1
- Home: 1–2–1

Coaches and captains
- Captain: James Roberts

The 1908–09 Pittsburgh men's ice hockey season was the 6th season of play for the program.

== Season ==
The team did not have a coach, however, K. D. McCutcheon served as team manager.

The University had changed its name to the 'University of Pittsburgh' in the summer of 1908 but did not adopt the Panther as its mascot until November 1909.

== Roster ==
| No. | Nat. | Player | Class | Pos | Height | Weight | DoB | Hometown | Previous team |
|---|---|---|---|---|---|---|---|---|---|
| | | Jay Bien | Freshman | R |
| | | Andrew I. Boyle Jr. | Senior | C |
| | | Frank R. Griffiths | Senior |
| | | Kenneth D. McCutcheon | Sophomore | D |
| | | William L. McDaniels | Freshman | LW |
| | | William F. Mueller | Senior | D |
| | | Charles S. Reed | Sophomore | G |
| | | James M. Roberts (C) | Junior | RW |
| | | Sylvester B. Scovel | Senior |
| | | John E. Sloan | Freshman |
| | | Wilford L. Thounhurst | Senior |

== Standings ==
1908–09 Collegiate ice hockey standings
| | Intercollegiate | | | | | | | Overall | | | | | |
| | GP | W | L | T | PCT. | GF | GA | GP | W | L | T | GF | GA |
|---|---|---|---|---|---|---|---|---|---|---|---|---|---|
| Amherst | 6 | 2 | 3 | 1 | .417 | 7 | 14 | 6 | 2 | 3 | 1 | 7 | 14 |
| Army | 1 | 0 | 1 | 0 | .000 | 1 | 2 | 2 | 0 | 1 | 1 | 2 | 3 |
| Carnegie Tech | 5 | 4 | 0 | 1 | .900 | 15 | 4 | 8 | 5 | 2 | 1 | 17 | 8 |
| Columbia | 5 | 1 | 4 | 0 | .200 | 12 | 27 | 5 | 1 | 4 | 0 | 12 | 27 |
| Cornell | 7 | 2 | 4 | 1 | .357 | 17 | 21 | 7 | 2 | 4 | 1 | 17 | 21 |
| Dartmouth | 8 | 6 | 2 | 0 | .750 | 24 | 11 | 14 | 11 | 3 | 0 | 47 | 23 |
| Harvard | 6 | 6 | 0 | 0 | 1.000 | 25 | 5 | 9 | 9 | 0 | 0 | 36 | 7 |
| Massachusetts Agricultural | 5 | 1 | 4 | 0 | .200 | 6 | 10 | 6 | 2 | 4 | 0 | 12 | 10 |
| MIT | 5 | 2 | 2 | 1 | .500 | 5 | 6 | 8 | 4 | 3 | 1 | 12 | 8 |
| Pennsylvania | 5 | 0 | 4 | 1 | .100 | 3 | 17 | 6 | 0 | 5 | 1 | 5 | 21 |
| Pittsburgh | 4 | 1 | 2 | 1 | .375 | 6 | 7 | 4 | 1 | 2 | 1 | 6 | 7 |
| Polytechnic Institute of Brooklyn | – | – | – | – | – | – | – | – | – | – | – | – | – |
| Princeton | 8 | 5 | 2 | 1 | .688 | 26 | 15 | 11 | 7 | 3 | 1 | 33 | 21 |
| Rensselaer | 6 | 2 | 4 | 0 | .333 | 13 | 20 | 6 | 2 | 4 | 0 | 13 | 20 |
| Springfield Training | – | – | – | – | – | – | – | – | – | – | – | – | – |
| Trinity | – | – | – | – | – | – | – | – | – | – | – | – | – |
| Union | – | – | – | – | – | – | – | 2 | 1 | 1 | 0 | – | – |
| Williams | 9 | 4 | 4 | 1 | .500 | 33 | 26 | 9 | 4 | 4 | 1 | 33 | 26 |
| Yale | 10 | 4 | 5 | 1 | .450 | 31 | 34 | 13 | 4 | 8 | 1 | 39 | 40 |

== Schedule and results ==
| Date | Opponent | Site | Result | Record |
Regular Season
| December 16 | vs. Carnegie Tech | Duquesne Garden • Pittsburgh, Pennsylvania | T 1–1 | 0–0–1 (0–0–1) |
| December 30 | Yale | Duquesne Garden • Pittsburgh, Pennsylvania | L 2–4 | 0–1–1 (0–1–1) |
| January 7 | Pennsylvania | Duquesne Garden • Pittsburgh, Pennsylvania | W 2–0 | 1–1–1 (1–1–1) |
| February 6 | Carnegie Tech | Duquesne Garden • Pittsburgh, Pennsylvania | L 1–2 | 1–2–1 (1–2–1) |
*Non-conference game.
