= 1908–09 Williams Ephs men's ice hockey season =

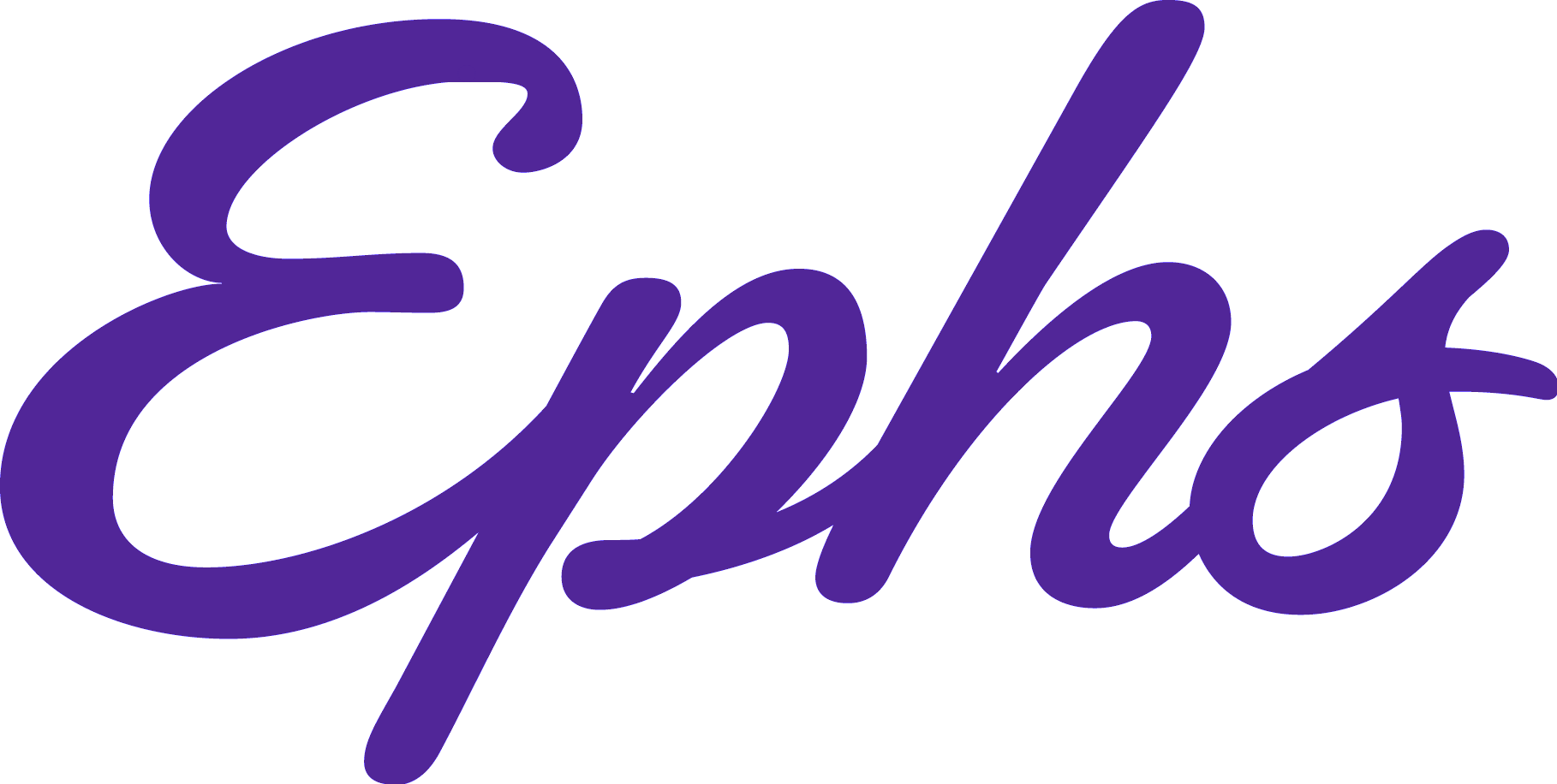
- Home ice: Cole Field House Pond

Record
- Overall: 4–4–1
- Home: 0–1–1
- Road: 1–1–0
- Neutral: 3–2–0

Coaches and captains

The 1908–09 Williams Ephs men's ice hockey season was the 6th season of play for the program.

== Season ==
After a tremendous season in 1908, Williams attempted to build on that success by scheduling four games against teams from the Intercollegiate Hockey Association. While it was not surprising that the Ephs lost many of those games, failing to win any of their first five games was a bit of a setback. Much of the hand-wringing ended when the team trounced Cornell 8–1, beginning a 4-game winning streak to end the season. Williams also played their first games against eventual long-time rival Amherst.

== Roster ==
No.	Nat.	Player	Class	Pos	Height	Weight	DoB	Hometown	Previous team
		Stanley P. Benton	Junior				1887-10-20
		George W. VanGorder	Sophomore

== Standings ==
1908–09 Collegiate ice hockey standings
	Intercollegiate							Overall					
	GP	W	L	T	PCT.	GF	GA	GP	W	L	T	GF	GA
Amherst	6	2	3	1	.417	7	14	6	2	3	1	7	14
Army	1	0	1	0	.000	1	2	2	0	1	1	2	3
Carnegie Tech	5	4	0	1	.900	15	4	8	5	2	1	17	8
Columbia	5	1	4	0	.200	12	27	5	1	4	0	12	27
Cornell	7	2	4	1	.357	17	21	7	2	4	1	17	21
Dartmouth	8	6	2	0	.750	24	11	14	11	3	0	47	23
Harvard	6	6	0	0	1.000	25	5	9	9	0	0	36	7
Massachusetts Agricultural	5	1	4	0	.200	6	10	6	2	4	0	12	10
MIT	5	2	2	1	.500	5	6	8	4	3	1	12	8
Pennsylvania	5	0	4	1	.100	3	17	6	0	5	1	5	21
Pittsburgh	4	1	2	1	.375	6	7	4	1	2	1	6	7
Polytechnic Institute of Brooklyn	–	–	–	–	–	–	–	–	–	–	–	–	–
Princeton	8	5	2	1	.688	26	15	11	7	3	1	33	21
Rensselaer	6	2	4	0	.333	13	20	6	2	4	0	13	20
Springfield Training	–	–	–	–	–	–	–	–	–	–	–	–	–
Trinity	–	–	–	–	–	–	–	–	–	–	–	–	–
Union	–	–	–	–	–	–	–	2	1	1	0	–	–
Williams	9	4	4	1	.500	33	26	9	4	4	1	33	26
Yale	10	4	5	1	.450	31	34	13	4	8	1	39	40

== Schedule and results ==
Date	Opponent	Site	Result	Record
Regular Season
December 23	vs. Princeton*	St. Nicholas Rink • New York, New York	L 2–5	0–1–0
January 8	vs. Rensselaer*	Empire Rink • Albany, New York	L 4–6	0–2–0
January 13	at Harvard*	Harvard Stadium Rink • Cambridge, Massachusetts	L 2–9	0–3–0
January 16	Dartmouth*	Cole Field House Pond • Williamstown, Massachusetts	L 2–3	0–4–0
January 23	Trinity*	Cole Field House Pond • Williamstown, Massachusetts	T 0–0	0–4–1
January 28	vs. Cornell*	Empire Rink • Albany, New York	W 8–1	1–4–1
February 4	vs. MIT*	Brae Burn Rink • Newton, Massachusetts	W 3–1	2–4–1
February 13	at Amherst*	Amherst, Massachusetts	W 6–0	3–4–1
February 19	vs. Amherst*	Empire Rink • Albany, New York	W 6–1	4–4–1
*Non-conference game.
