= 1908–09 Princeton Tigers men's ice hockey season =

College ice hockey season

- Conference: T–3rd IHA
- Home ice: Lake Carnegie

Record
- Overall: 7–3–1
- Conference: 1–2–1
- Road: 2–1–0
- Neutral: 5–2–1

Coaches and captains
- Captain: Charles Coxe

The 1908–09 Princeton Tigers men's ice hockey season was the 10th season of play for the program.

== Season ==
Unlike the previous year, Princeton got off to a good start, winning its first two games with good defensive effort. The Tigers entered their winter break with a possible seven games on the slate before the IHA schedule began. While Princeton ended up playing five games, they won four of the matches and swept a three-game series against Yale, shutting the Elis out in all three games.

Right after the break the Intercollegiate Hockey Association schedule began with a match against Columbia that Princeton took 5–2. Ten days later the Tigers headed into their match with Harvard with a 7–1 record and hopes of earning their second championship. Goaltender Clarence Peacock was the star of the game, stopping 21 shots that came his way but the Crimson press turned out to be just too much and the Tigers fell 2–3. After a second loss in conference play the Tigers lost any chance they had at capturing the title but the team ended their season with an exciting game against the Bulldogs that saw four overtime goals scored in a 5–5 draw.

William H. Myers Jr. served as team manager.

== Roster ==
No.	Nat.	Player	Class	Pos	Height	Weight	DoB	Hometown	Previous team
		Montgomery Angell	Sophomore	F
		Cyril Ballin	Junior	D
		Joshua Brush	Senior	F
		Charles Coxe (C)	Senior	F
		Maitland Dwight	Sophomore	F
		William Laird	Sophomore	F
		John Lionberger	Sophomore	F
		Clarence Peacock Jr.	Junior	G
		Schuyler Phillips	Senior	F
		Roger Prescott	Sophomore	F
		Frederic Read	Junior	D
		Roswell Rolston	Junior	F
		James Schoonmaker	Sophomore	F
		Walter Spelman	Junior	F
		Whitman		D

== Standings ==
1908–09 Collegiate ice hockey standings
	Intercollegiate							Overall					
	GP	W	L	T	PCT.	GF	GA	GP	W	L	T	GF	GA
Amherst	6	2	3	1	.417	7	14	6	2	3	1	7	14
Army	1	0	1	0	.000	1	2	2	0	1	1	2	3
Carnegie Tech	5	4	0	1	.900	15	4	8	5	2	1	17	8
Columbia	5	1	4	0	.200	12	27	5	1	4	0	12	27
Cornell	7	2	4	1	.357	17	21	7	2	4	1	17	21
Dartmouth	8	6	2	0	.750	24	11	14	11	3	0	47	23
Harvard	6	6	0	0	1.000	25	5	9	9	0	0	36	7
Massachusetts Agricultural	5	1	4	0	.200	6	10	6	2	4	0	12	10
MIT	5	2	2	1	.500	5	6	8	4	3	1	12	8
Pennsylvania	5	0	4	1	.100	3	17	6	0	5	1	5	21
Pittsburgh	4	1	2	1	.375	6	7	4	1	2	1	6	7
Polytechnic Institute of Brooklyn	–	–	–	–	–	–	–	–	–	–	–	–	–
Princeton	8	5	2	1	.688	26	15	11	7	3	1	33	21
Rensselaer	6	2	4	0	.333	13	20	6	2	4	0	13	20
Springfield Training	–	–	–	–	–	–	–	–	–	–	–	–	–
Trinity	–	–	–	–	–	–	–	–	–	–	–	–	–
Union	–	–	–	–	–	–	–	2	1	1	0	–	–
Williams	9	4	4	1	.500	33	26	9	4	4	1	33	26
Yale	10	4	5	1	.450	31	34	13	4	8	1	39	40

1908–09 Intercollegiate Hockey Association standings
	Conference							Overall					
	GP	W	L	T	PTS	GF	GA	GP	W	L	T	GF	GA
Harvard *	4	4	0	0	8	14	3	9	9	0	0	36	7
Dartmouth	4	3	1	0	6	10	7	14	11	3	0	47	23
Yale	4	1	2	1	3	18	17	13	4	8	1	39	40
Princeton	4	1	2	1	3	14	13	11	7	3	1	33	21
Columbia	4	0	4	0	0	9	25	5	1	4	0	12	27
* indicates conference champion

== Schedule and results ==
Date	Opponent	Site	Result	Record
Regular Season
December 4	vs. Brooklyn Crescents*	St. Nicholas Rink • New York, New York	W 3–2	1–0–0
December 9	at New York Hockey Club*	St. Nicholas Rink • New York, New York	W 3–0	2–0–0
December 23	vs. Williams*	St. Nicholas Rink • New York, New York	W 5–2	3–0–0
December 31	vs. Yale*	Duquesne Garden • Pittsburgh, Pennsylvania	W 2–0	4–0–0
January 1	vs. Yale*	Duquesne Garden • Pittsburgh, Pennsylvania	W 1–0	5–0–0
January 2	vs. Yale*	Duquesne Garden • Pittsburgh, Pennsylvania	W 4–0	6–0–0
January 4	at Louden Field Club*	Empire Rink • Albany, New York	L 1–4	6–1–0
January 6	at Columbia	St. Nicholas Rink • New York, New York	W 5–2	7–1–0 (1–0–0)
January 16	vs. Harvard	St. Nicholas Rink • New York, New York	L 2–3	7–2–0 (1–1–0)
January 22	vs. Dartmouth	St. Nicholas Rink • New York, New York	L 2–3	7–3–0 (1–2–0)
February 13	vs. Yale	St. Nicholas Rink • New York, New York	T 5–5 ^{OT}	7–3–1 (1–2–1)
*Non-conference game.
