= 1908–09 MIT Engineers men's ice hockey season =

- Conference: Independent

Record
- Overall: 4–3–1
- Road: 1–0–0
- Neutral: 3–3–1

Coaches and captains
- Captain: William Kelly

The 1908–09 MIT Engineers men's ice hockey season was the 10th season of play for the program.

== Season ==
The team did not have a head coach but William O'Hearn served as team manager.

Note: Massachusetts Institute of Technology athletics were referred to as 'Engineers' or 'Techmen' during the first two decades of the 20th century. By 1920 all sports programs had adopted the Engineer moniker.

== Roster ==
No.	Nat.	Player	Class	Pos	Height	Weight	DoB	Hometown	Previous team
		Donald Bakewell	Sophomore	G
		Harold Billings	Junior	D
		John Davis	Senior	G
		Allen Gould	Junior	D
		Richard Gould	Sophomore
		William Kelly (C)	Senior	F
		William O'Hearn	Junior	F
		Harold Paine	Senior	F
		Vernon Sloan	Freshman
		Philip Taylor	Junior

== Standings ==
1908–09 Collegiate ice hockey standings
	Intercollegiate							Overall					
	GP	W	L	T	PCT.	GF	GA	GP	W	L	T	GF	GA
Amherst	6	2	3	1	.417	7	14	6	2	3	1	7	14
Army	1	0	1	0	.000	1	2	2	0	1	1	2	3
Carnegie Tech	5	4	0	1	.900	15	4	8	5	2	1	17	8
Columbia	5	1	4	0	.200	12	27	5	1	4	0	12	27
Cornell	7	2	4	1	.357	17	21	7	2	4	1	17	21
Dartmouth	8	6	2	0	.750	24	11	14	11	3	0	47	23
Harvard	6	6	0	0	1.000	25	5	9	9	0	0	36	7
Massachusetts Agricultural	5	1	4	0	.200	6	10	6	2	4	0	12	10
MIT	5	2	2	1	.500	5	6	8	4	3	1	12	8
Pennsylvania	5	0	4	1	.100	3	17	6	0	5	1	5	21
Pittsburgh	4	1	2	1	.375	6	7	4	1	2	1	6	7
Polytechnic Institute of Brooklyn	–	–	–	–	–	–	–	–	–	–	–	–	–
Princeton	8	5	2	1	.688	26	15	11	7	3	1	33	21
Rensselaer	6	2	4	0	.333	13	20	6	2	4	0	13	20
Springfield Training	–	–	–	–	–	–	–	–	–	–	–	–	–
Trinity	–	–	–	–	–	–	–	–	–	–	–	–	–
Union	–	–	–	–	–	–	–	2	1	1	0	–	–
Williams	9	4	4	1	.500	33	26	9	4	4	1	33	26
Yale	10	4	5	1	.450	31	34	13	4	8	1	39	40

== Schedule and results ==
Date	Opponent	Site	Result	Record
Regular Season
January 4 †	vs. Dartmouth*	Brae Burn Rink • Newton, Massachusetts	W 2–1	1–0–0
January 6	vs. Harvard*	Brae Burn Rink • Newton, Massachusetts	L 0–1	1–1–0
January 9	vs. Crescent Hockey Club*	Harvard Stadium Rink • Boston, Massachusetts	L 1–2	1–2–0
January 16	at Phillips Academy*	Andover, Massachusetts	W 3–0	2–2–0
February 3	vs. Brown ‡*	Brae Burn Rink • Newton, Massachusetts	W 3–0	3–2–0
February 4	vs. Williams*	Brae Burn Rink • Newton, Massachusetts	L 1–3	3–3–0
February 5	vs. Massachusetts Agricultural College*	Brae Burn Rink • Newton, Massachusetts	W 1–0	4–3–0
February 6	vs. Amherst*	Brae Burn Rink • Newton, Massachusetts	T 1–1 ^{2OT}	4–3–1
*Non-conference game.

† The Game was postponed from December 31.
‡ The team was composed of Brown students without any official sanction from the University.
