= 1908–09 Penn Quakers men's ice hockey season =

Record
- Overall: 0–5–1
- Road: 0–3–0
- Neutral: 0–2–1

Coaches and captains
- Captain: Harry Campbell

The 1908–09 Penn Quakers men's ice hockey season was the 5th season of play for the program.

== Season ==
After remaining dormant for several years, Penn restarted its ice hockey program in 1908. The team used the rowing room at the campus gymnasium to practice while waiting for the weather to grow cold. The team arranged to play three games in Cleveland against local teams but those plans had to be changed and Cornell stepped in for all three matches. Penn tied the first game before losing the remaining two in the team's official return to action. The team scheduled several games to occur over the succeeding month or so but, due to the warm weather, none of the games were played and the season was essentially cancelled in mid-February.

The team did not have a head coach but Duncan Worrell served as team manager.

== Roster ==
No.	Nat.	Player	Class	Pos	Height	Weight	DoB	Hometown	Previous team
		Donald E. Campbell	Junior	LW/C
	(United States)	Harry L. Campbell	Junior	C			1886-02-08	Pittsburgh, Pennsylvania
		J. F. Haggerty		W
		Robert E. Harlow	Freshman	LW
		Walter G. Hayden	Sophomore	D/LW
	(United States)	William M. Hollenback	Senior	D			1886-02-22	Blue Bell, Pennsylvania
		Edward A. King	Freshman	R
		Charles B. Maits	Graduate	G
		W. H. Young		D

== Standings ==
1908–09 Collegiate ice hockey standings
	Intercollegiate							Overall					
	GP	W	L	T	PCT.	GF	GA	GP	W	L	T	GF	GA
Amherst	6	2	3	1	.417	7	14	6	2	3	1	7	14
Army	1	0	1	0	.000	1	2	2	0	1	1	2	3
Carnegie Tech	5	4	0	1	.900	15	4	8	5	2	1	17	8
Columbia	5	1	4	0	.200	12	27	5	1	4	0	12	27
Cornell	7	2	4	1	.357	17	21	7	2	4	1	17	21
Dartmouth	8	6	2	0	.750	24	11	14	11	3	0	47	23
Harvard	6	6	0	0	1.000	25	5	9	9	0	0	36	7
Massachusetts Agricultural	5	1	4	0	.200	6	10	6	2	4	0	12	10
MIT	5	2	2	1	.500	5	6	8	4	3	1	12	8
Pennsylvania	5	0	4	1	.100	3	17	6	0	5	1	5	21
Pittsburgh	4	1	2	1	.375	6	7	4	1	2	1	6	7
Polytechnic Institute of Brooklyn	–	–	–	–	–	–	–	–	–	–	–	–	–
Princeton	8	5	2	1	.688	26	15	11	7	3	1	33	21
Rensselaer	6	2	4	0	.333	13	20	6	2	4	0	13	20
Springfield Training	–	–	–	–	–	–	–	–	–	–	–	–	–
Trinity	–	–	–	–	–	–	–	–	–	–	–	–	–
Union	–	–	–	–	–	–	–	2	1	1	0	–	–
Williams	9	4	4	1	.500	33	26	9	4	4	1	33	26
Yale	10	4	5	1	.450	31	34	13	4	8	1	39	40

== Schedule and results ==
Date	Opponent	Site	Result	Record
Regular Season
December 31	vs. Cornell*	Elysium Arena • Cleveland, Ohio	T 2–2	0–0–1
January 1	vs. Cornell*	Elysium Arena • Cleveland, Ohio	L 1–3	0–2–1
January 2	vs. Cornell*	Elysium Arena • Cleveland, Ohio	L 0–6	0–2–1
January 5	at Crescent Athletic Association*	Elysium Arena • Cleveland, Ohio	L 2–4	0–3–1
January 6	at Carnegie Tech*	Duquesne Garden • Pittsburgh, Pennsylvania	L 0–4	0–4–1
January 7	at Pittsburgh*	Duquesne Garden • Pittsburgh, Pennsylvania	L 0–2	0–5–1
*Non-conference game.
