= 1908–09 Columbia men's ice hockey season =

- Conference: 5th IHA
- Home ice: St. Nicholas Rink

Record
- Overall: 1–4–0
- Conference: 0–4–0

Coaches and captains
- Head coach: Rudolph von Bernuth
- Captain: George Shafer

The 1908–09 Columbia men's ice hockey season was the 13th season of play for the program.

== Season ==
P. E. Locke served as team manager. Despite being one of the earliest universities to support an ice hockey team, Columbia had never achieved much success against collegiate opponents. Owing to this, the incoming class had little enthusiasm for the club which was demonstrated by the lack of candidates for the freshman team. While the freshman squad was eventually compiled, the varsity team finished the season dead last in the IHA.

Note: Columbia University adopted the Lion as its mascot in 1910.

== Roster ==
No.	Nat.	Player	Class	Pos	Height	Weight	DoB	Hometown	Previous team
		Ray Barnum	Junior	D
		H. M. Bond	Freshman	C
		Albert Borchardt	Senior	D
		Warren Kinney	Sophomore	LW
		Lloyd Kistler	Senior	W/D
		John Lovejoy	Junior	R/RW
		James Mackenzie	Junior	LW
		Robert Murphy	Junior	G
		S. F. Murphy	Junior	C
		Samuel Nathan	Senior	LW
		George C. Shafer (C)	Senior	R

== Standings ==
1908–09 Collegiate ice hockey standings
	Intercollegiate							Overall					
	GP	W	L	T	PCT.	GF	GA	GP	W	L	T	GF	GA
Amherst	6	2	3	1	.417	7	14	6	2	3	1	7	14
Army	1	0	1	0	.000	1	2	2	0	1	1	2	3
Carnegie Tech	5	4	0	1	.900	15	4	8	5	2	1	17	8
Columbia	5	1	4	0	.200	12	27	5	1	4	0	12	27
Cornell	7	2	4	1	.357	17	21	7	2	4	1	17	21
Dartmouth	8	6	2	0	.750	24	11	14	11	3	0	47	23
Harvard	6	6	0	0	1.000	25	5	9	9	0	0	36	7
Massachusetts Agricultural	5	1	4	0	.200	6	10	6	2	4	0	12	10
MIT	5	2	2	1	.500	5	6	8	4	3	1	12	8
Pennsylvania	5	0	4	1	.100	3	17	6	0	5	1	5	21
Pittsburgh	4	1	2	1	.375	6	7	4	1	2	1	6	7
Polytechnic Institute of Brooklyn	–	–	–	–	–	–	–	–	–	–	–	–	–
Princeton	8	5	2	1	.688	26	15	11	7	3	1	33	21
Rensselaer	6	2	4	0	.333	13	20	6	2	4	0	13	20
Springfield Training	–	–	–	–	–	–	–	–	–	–	–	–	–
Trinity	–	–	–	–	–	–	–	–	–	–	–	–	–
Union	–	–	–	–	–	–	–	2	1	1	0	–	–
Williams	9	4	4	1	.500	33	26	9	4	4	1	33	26
Yale	10	4	5	1	.450	31	34	13	4	8	1	39	40

1908–09 Intercollegiate Hockey Association standings
	Conference							Overall					
	GP	W	L	T	PTS	GF	GA	GP	W	L	T	GF	GA
Harvard *	4	4	0	0	8	14	3	9	9	0	0	36	7
Dartmouth	4	3	1	0	6	10	7	14	11	3	0	47	23
Yale	4	1	2	1	3	18	17	13	4	8	1	39	40
Princeton	4	1	2	1	3	14	13	11	7	3	1	33	21
Columbia	4	0	4	0	0	9	25	5	1	4	0	12	27
* indicates conference champion

== Schedule and results ==
Date	Opponent	Site	Result	Record
Regular Season
January 6	Princeton	St. Nicholas Rink • New York, New York	L 2–5	0–1–0 (0–1–0)
January 9	Harvard	St. Nicholas Rink • New York, New York	L 1–5	0–2–0 (0–2–0)
January 15	at Rensselaer*	Empire Rink • Albany, New York	W 3–2	1–2–0
January 20	Dartmouth	St. Nicholas Rink • New York, New York	L 2–4 ^{OT †}	1–3–0 (0–3–0)
February 2	Yale	St. Nicholas Rink • New York, New York	L 4–11	1–4–0 (0–4–0)
*Non-conference game.

† some overtime games were not sudden-death and teams played an entire extra period.

== Scoring Statistics ==
Name	Position	Games	Goals
H. M. Bond	C	4	6
S. F. Murphy	C	1	2
C. Schaefer	R	4	2
Albert Borschard	D	5	1
John Lovejoy	R/RW	5	1
James Mackenzie	LW	1	0
Warren Kinney	LW	1	0
Lloyd Kistler	W/D	3	0
Samuel Nathan	LW	4	0
Ray Barnum	D	4	0
Robert Murphy	G	5	0
Total			12

Note: Assists were not recorded as a statistic.
