= Smith–Connally Act =

American law

- Other short titles: National War Labor Board Abolition Act; Smith-Connally Anti-Strike Act
- Long title: An Act relating to the use and operation by the United States of certain plants, mines, and facilities in the prosecution of the war, and preventing strikes, lock-outs, and stoppages of production, and for other purposes.
- Acronyms (colloquial): WLDA
- Nicknames: War Labor Disputes Act
- Enacted by: the 78th United States Congress
- Effective: June 25, 1943

Citations
- Public law: 78-89
- Statutes at Large: 57 Stat. 163

Codification
- Titles amended: 50 U.S.C.: War and National Defense
- U.S.C. sections created: 50a U.S.C. § 1501

Legislative history
- Introduced in the Senate as S. 796 by Tom Connally (D-TX), Howard W. Smith (D-VA) on September 5, 1942; Passed the Senate on May 5, 1943 (63-16); Passed the House on June 4, 1943 (233-141); Reported by the joint conference committee on June 10, 1943; agreed to by the House on June 11, 1943 (220-130) and by the Senate on June 12, 1943 (55-22); Vetoed by President Franklin D. Roosevelt on June 25, 1943; Overridden by the Senate on June 25, 1943 (56-25); Overridden by the House and became law on June 25, 1943 (244-108)

The Smith–Connally Act or War Labor Disputes Act (50 U.S.C. App. 1501 et seq.) was an American law passed on June 25, 1943, over President Franklin D. Roosevelt's veto. The legislation was hurriedly created after 400,000 coal miners, their wages significantly lowered because of high wartime inflation, struck for a $2-a-day wage increase.

The Act allowed the federal government to seize and operate industries threatened by or under strikes that would interfere with war production, and prohibited unions from making contributions in federal elections.

The war powers bestowed by the Act were first used in August 1944 when the Fair Employment Practices Commission ordered the Philadelphia Transportation Company to hire African Americans as motormen. The 10,000 members of the Philadelphia Rapid Transit Employees Union (PRTEU), a labor union unaffiliated with either the American Federation of Labor or the Congress of Industrial Organizations, led a sick-out strike, now known as the Philadelphia transit strike of 1944, for six days. President Roosevelt sent 8,000 United States Army troops to the city to seize and operate the transit system, and threatened to draft any PRTEU member who did not return to the job within 48 hours. Roosevelt's actions broke the strike.

== Bibliography ==
- Atleson, James B. Labor and the Wartime State: Labor Relations and Law During World War II. Urbana, Ill.: University of Illinois Press, 1998.
- Goodwin, Doris Kearns. No Ordinary Time: Franklin and Eleanor Roosevelt: The Home Front in World War II. New York: Simon & Schuster, 1995.
- Karatnycky, Adrian. Freedom in the World: The Annual Survey of Political Rights and Civil Liberties, 2000-2001. Rev. ed. Piscataway, N.J.: Transaction Publishers, 2000.
- Klinkner, Philip A. and Smith, Rogers M. The Unsteady March: The Rise and Decline of Racial Equality in America. Chicago: University of Chicago Press, 2002.
- La Raja, Raymond J. Small Change: Money, Political Parties, and Campaign Finance Reform. Ann Arbor, Mich: University of Michigan Press, 2008.
- Malsberger, John William. From Obstruction to Moderation: The Transformation of Senate Conservatism, 1938-1952. Selinsgrove, Pann.: Susquehanna University Press, 2000.
- "Philadelphia Transit Strike (1944)." In Encyclopedia of U.S. Labor and Working-Class History. Eric Arnesen, ed. New York: CRC Press, 2007.
- Sabato, Larry and Ernst, Howard R. Encyclopedia of American Political Parties and Elections. New York: Facts On File, 2006.
- "Trouble in Philadelphia." Time. August 14, 1944.
- Wagner, Margaret E.; Kennedy, David M.; Osborne, Linda Barrett; and Reyburn, Susan. The Library of Congress World War II Companion. New York: Simon and Schuster, 2007.
- Winkler, Allan. "The Philadelphia Transit Strike of 1944." Journal of American History. June 1972.
