= Chippy Gaw =

American sportsman (1892–1968)

- Pitcher
- Born: March 13, 1892; West Newton, Massachusetts, U.S.
- Died: May 26, 1968 (aged 76); Boston, Massachusetts, U.S.
- Batted: Right Threw: Right

MLB debut
- April 20, 1920, for the Chicago Cubs

Last MLB appearance
- July 4, 1920, for the Chicago Cubs

MLB statistics
- Win–loss record: 1–1
- Earned run average: 4.85
- Innings: 13.0
- Stats at Baseball Reference

Teams
- Chicago Cubs (1920)

George Joseph "Chippy" Gaw (March 13, 1892 – May 5, 1968) was an American professional baseball pitcher and college ice hockey and baseball coach. He appeared in six Major League Baseball games for the Chicago Cubs in 1920.

== Biography ==
A native of West Newton, Massachusetts, Gaw was a high school baseball and hockey star for Newton, and began playing minor league baseball at age 19. Throughout the 1910s, he played for the Brockton Shoemakers and Worcester Busters of the New England League, and the Toronto Maple Leafs, Buffalo Bisons, and Providence Grays of the International League. Along the way, he received his degree in dentistry from Tufts University.

Gaw made his major league debut with the Chicago Cubs in the 1920 season. He pitched in six major league games for the Cubs, posting a 4.85 ERA in 13 innings of work, and recording one hit and one run in four plate appearances. Gaw's longest outing for Chicago came on June 11 when he tossed 7.1 innings in relief of Speed Martin against the Philadelphia Phillies in an 8-3 Cubs loss at the Baker Bowl. The Cubs sent Gaw down to the Indianapolis Indians in July. He spent 1921 with the Milwaukee Brewers of the American Association, his final season in professional baseball.

After his professional playing career, Gaw went on to coach at the collegiate level. He was head ice hockey coach at Dartmouth College (1921–1922), Princeton University (1922–1924) and Boston University (1924–1928), and also coached baseball at BU.

In 1926, he pitched and was the player-manager for Falmouth in the Cape Cod Baseball League, where his star player was future major leaguer Josh Billings. At Falmouth, Gaw was described as "a brainy ball player, an excellent pitcher, [having] a wonderful and most pleasing personality, and a gentleman par excellence at all times." Gaw died in 1968.

== Head coaching record ==
=== Ice hockey ===
Record table
Season	Team	Overall	Conference	Standing	Postseason
MIT Engineers Independent (1920–1921)
1920–21	MIT	3–4–0			
MIT:		3–4–0			
Dartmouth Independent (1921–1922)
1921–22	Dartmouth	4–1–1			
Dartmouth:		4–1–1			
Princeton Tigers Independent (1922–1924)
1922–23	Princeton	12–5–1			
1923–24	Princeton	12–6–0			
Princeton:		24–11–1			
Boston University Terriers Independent (1924–1928)
1924–25	Boston University	7–4–1			
1925–26	Boston University	7–8–0			
1926–27	Boston University	2–5–1			
1927–28	Boston University	6–2–1			
Boston University:		22–19–3			
Total:		53–35–5			
National champion Postseason invitational champion Conference regular season champion Conference regular season and conference tournament champion Division regular season champion Division regular season and conference tournament champion Conference tournament champion
