= 1920–21 Princeton Tigers men's ice hockey season =

College ice hockey season

- Conference: 2nd THL
- Home ice: Philadelphia Auditorium and Ice Palace

Record
- Overall: 4–4–0
- Conference: 2–1–0
- Home: 0–1–0
- Road: 0–2–0
- Neutral: 4–1–0

Coaches and captains
- Head coach: Russell O. Ellis
- Captain: Eugene Maxwell

The 1920–21 Princeton Tigers men's ice hockey season was the 21st season of play for the program. The Tigers were coached Russell O. Ellis in his first season.

== Season ==
Princeton's season got underway in early December with the first meeting of prospective players. The inexperienced players were set to go down to the Philadelphia Ice Palace for on-ice training. Eight players were returning for the Tigers, however, with how bad the team had performed in '20 that was not necessarily a positive. After the first on-ice drills were held, Gus Hornfeck, who had coached the team before the war, agreed to return and take over the squad after Christmas. At the same time, the team came to an agreement with the operators of the Ice Palace to use the venue as their home rink for the season. While this did afford the team access to good ice, it also meant that the Tigers were only able to schedule 8 games due to high demand for the arena. In order to bolster their schedule, the Tigers set up a trip to Buffalo during the winter break where they would play several Canadian teams.

Just before the team was to leave for Buffalo, they received news that warm weather had caused all of the available rinks to become unusable. Instead, the team headed to the Ice Palace and got in several days of practice that they hoped would set them up well for the rest of the schedule. In the run up to the first game, Hornfeck was absent. This left the team to be run by Eugene Maxwell. While the players did a good job preparing themselves for the match, they were unable to properly account for the strange nature of Fordham's rink. Not only was the 181st Street Ice Palace much smaller than they were used to, but it had 4 pillar set into the ice that had to be avoided during the match. The obstacles caused the team quite a bit of trouble but the Tigers were able to keep pace with the Rams regardless. Princeton kept the game close and had a chance to tie the match late but ran out of time. After the game, the team announced that Russell Ellis of the St. Nicholas Hockey Club had been engaged to take over as coach. A few days later the second game was played against the Quaker City Hockey Club, a semi-pro outfit from Philadelphia. The team looked better than they had against Fordham but their opponents were more experienced and easily able to sink the Tigers. Despite using many alternates in the match, Princeton was unable to keep up with the pros.

The early baptism by fire helped turn the team into a formidable unit and the results were on full display by the end of the week when Princeton dominated Penn to earn its first win of the season. Keyes, who had been moved up to starting wing for the game, led the way with a hat-trick while Haight and Knox were also very visible in the game. A week later the team opened their conference slate by taking on Yale. Several good practices, including a few held on Lake Carnegie, had the team well prepared for the Elis and Princeton got off to a quick start. In front of a boisterous crowd, Haight kicked off the scoring and then doubled the Princeton lead in the second. Yale responded with goals in each of the final two periods and forced the match into overtime. Knox scored almost immediately after the puck was dropped and then added a second before a minute had elapsed. After this, the team played defense for the remainder of the 5-minute session and skated away with a victory.

Entering the game with Harvard, the team had to change tactics. Since the Crimson stubbornly continued to play 7-man hockey, the Tigers had to promote one of their reserves to starter so that the rover position could be filled. Even without those changes, the Tigers were facing a daunting challenge as Harvard was the top team in the country and already well on its way to winning another intercollegiate championship. In front of some 7,500 Boston fans, Princeton got off to a good start but couldn't get the puck behind the Crimson netminder. As the pace picked up, Harvard began to distance themselves from the Tigers and in short order the game became a runaway. When the dust settled Princeton was on the wrong end of a 0–7 score and had no margin for error if it wanted a chance at a league title.

During the exam break, the team spent a few days practicing on the St. Paul's School rink. The extended layoff had the Tigers on the shelf until mid-February but, once they returned for the rematch with Yale, the didn't seem to be any drop in production. Wonham started the game with his first goal of the season and from then on the match was tilted in Princeton's favor. Yale's defense stiffened in the second but they could get nothing through the Tiger defense. Princeton on the whole looked like the best version of itself and made the onlooking Boston crowd nervous for the rematch with Harvard. The game was the first match on the year for Cook, who had been academically ineligible to start the year, and he took over the starting spot from Ehret, who was out with an injury.

Entering the rematch with Penn, the team was still without Ehret but then lost Keyes to injury as well. Corcoran was slotted in at win but the absence of the two starting wingers hampered the Tiger attack. Princeton was only able to score twice against the Quakers but the defense played one of its best games all season and didn't give an inch. Hight and Wonham were nigh impenetrable in the match and allowed the offence the time it needed to get up to speed. Cook and Merritt scored in the third and secured the victory for the Tigers.

Entering the game with Dartmouth, the team was shorthanded by injury. During a practice game with Bryn Athyn Academy, Wonham was felled and would be out for the rest of the year to recover. Corcoran, too, was out after having developed a knee effusion following the game with Penn. While Keyes was still sidelined, Ehret was set to return, though his effectiveness was unknown. On game day, Ehret suddenly reported a resurgence of pain and was forced to beg off. Maxwell, who had been planning to play, came down with case of grippe and left the team with just 2 regulars in the lineup (Knox and Haight). Maxwell played through his illness and the team fought hard to stay in the game. After scoreless first the two traded goals in the second. The third, however, saw Dartmouth take over and score three unanswered goals to take the game.

A rematch with Harvard had been slated to take place in March, however, the Crimson decided against venturing south and allowed the single game between the two to stand for the season series.

== Roster ==
No.	Nat.	Player	Class	Pos	Height	Weight	DoB	Hometown	Previous team
	(United States)	William H. Brown	Sophomore	LW/RW				Lewiston, New York
	(United States)	Frank H. Cook	Sophomore	RW			1899-11-28	Colorado Springs, Colorado
		Francis L. Corcoran	Junior	LW/RW			1899-04-03
		Richard Ehret	Senior	LW
	(United States)	Richard A. Haight	Senior	D/RW				Chicago, Illinois
	(United States)	Edward L. Keyes III	Senior	D/W			1899-11-04	Manhattan, New York
	(United States)	Alan G. Knox	Senior	C			1899-05-01
	(United States)	Frederic W. Lincoln IV	Senior	R/LW			1898-10-15	New York, New York
	(United States)	Walter S. MacPhee	Junior	G			1899-12-23	Brooklyn, New York
	(United States)	Eugene L. Maxwell (C)	Junior	G				Brooklyn, New York
	(United States)	Schuyler Merritt II	Junior	R/C/RW				Eastchester, New York
	(United States)	John L. Tallman	Junior	D/R			1898-11-16	New York, New York
	(United States)	W. Stapley Wonham	Junior	D			1889-08-15

== Standings ==
1920–21 College ice hockey standings
	Intercollegiate							Overall					
	GP	W	L	T	Pct.	GF	GA	GP	W	L	T	GF	GA
Amherst	7	0	7	0	.000	8	19	7	0	7	0	8	19
Army	3	0	2	1	.167	6	11	3	0	2	1	6	11
Bates	4	2	2	0	.500	7	8	8	4	4	0	22	20
Boston College	7	6	1	0	.857	27	11	8	6	2	0	28	18
Bowdoin	4	0	3	1	.125	1	10	7	1	5	1	10	23
Buffalo	–	–	–	–	–	–	–	6	0	6	0	–	–
Carnegie Tech	5	0	4	1	.100	4	18	5	0	4	1	4	18
Clarkson	1	0	1	0	.000	1	6	3	2	1	0	12	14
Colgate	4	1	3	0	.250	8	14	5	2	3	0	9	14
Columbia	5	1	4	0	.200	21	24	5	1	4	0	21	24
Cornell	5	3	2	0	.600	22	10	5	3	2	0	22	10
Dartmouth	9	5	3	1	.611	24	21	11	6	4	1	30	27
Fordham	–	–	–	–	–	–	–	–	–	–	–	–	–
Hamilton	–	–	–	–	–	–	–	10	10	0	0	–	–
Harvard	6	6	0	0	1.000	42	3	10	8	2	0	55	8
Massachusetts Agricultural	7	3	4	0	.429	18	17	7	3	4	0	18	17
Michigan College of Mines	2	1	1	0	.500	9	5	10	6	4	0	29	21
MIT	6	3	3	0	.500	13	21	7	3	4	0	16	25
New York State	–	–	–	–	–	–	–	–	–	–	–	–	–
Notre Dame	3	2	1	0	.667	7	9	3	2	1	0	7	9
Pennsylvania	8	3	4	1	.438	17	37	9	3	5	1	18	44
Princeton	7	4	3	0	.571	18	16	8	4	4	0	20	23
Rensselaer	4	1	3	0	.250	7	13	4	1	3	0	7	13
Tufts	–	–	–	–	–	–	–	–	–	–	–	–	–
Williams	5	4	1	0	.800	17	10	6	5	1	0	21	10
Yale	8	3	4	1	.438	21	33	10	3	6	1	25	47
YMCA College	6	5	0	1	.917	17	9	7	5	1	1	20	16

1920–21 Triangular Hockey League standings
	Conference								Overall					
	GP	W	L	T	PTS	SW	GF	GA	GP	W	L	T	GF	GA
Harvard *	3	3	0	0	1.000	2	27	1	10	8	2	0	55	8
Princeton	3	2	1	0	.667	1	8	9	8	4	4	0	20	23
Yale	4	0	4	0	.000	0	3	28	10	3	6	1	25	47
* indicates conference champion

== Schedule and results ==
Date	Opponent	Site	Result	Record
Regular Season
January 8	at Fordham*	181st Street Ice Palace • Manhattan, New York	L 1–2	0–1–0
January 11	vs. Quaker City Hockey Club*	Philadelphia Ice Palace • Philadelphia, Pennsylvania	L 2–7	0–2–0
January 14	vs. Pennsylvania*	Philadelphia Ice Palace • Philadelphia, Pennsylvania	W 6–1	1–2–0
January 22	vs. Yale	Philadelphia Ice Palace • Philadelphia, Pennsylvania	W 4–2	2–2–0 (1–0–0)
January 29	at Harvard	Boston Arena • Boston, Massachusetts	L 0–7	2–3–0 (1–1–0)
February 19	vs. Yale	Boston Arena • Boston, Massachusetts	W 4–0	3–3–0 (2–1–0)
February 25	vs. Pennsylvania*	Philadelphia Ice Palace • Philadelphia, Pennsylvania	W 2–0	4–3–0
March 5	Dartmouth*	Philadelphia Ice Palace • Philadelphia, Pennsylvania	L 1–4	4–4–0
*Non-conference game.

== Scoring statistics ==
Name	Position	Games	Goals
Alan Knox	C	8	5
Richard Haight	CP/RW	8	4
Ed Keyes	CP/LW/RW	6	3
Schuyler Merritt	R/C/RW	4	2
Stapley Wonham	P	7	2
Frank Cook	RW	3	1
Frederic Lincoln	R/LW	3	1
Jack Tallman	P/R	3	1
Richard Ehret	LW	5	1
Walter MacPhee	G	1	0
William Brown	LW/RW	5	0
Francis Corcoran	LW/RW	6	0
Eugene Maxwell	G	8	0
Total			20
