= 1920–21 Michigan College of Mines Huskies men's ice hockey season =

- Conference: Independent

Record
- Overall: 6–4–0
- Home: 1–0–0
- Road: 4–3–0
- Neutral: 1–1–0

Coaches and captains
- Head coach: Elmer Sicotte
- Captain: Colin Thistlewaite

The 1920–21 Michigan College of Mines Huskies men's ice hockey season was the 2nd season of play for the program. The Huskies were coached by Elmer Sicotte in his 1st season.

== Season ==
With the program now established, MCM was able to put together an expansive schedule that more than doubled the number of games. Though there were few collegiate opponents available, the Huskies managed to secure 2-game series with both Michigan and Notre Dame. Most games were played on the road, however, the Huskies were able to use the Amphidrome for a few of their matches.

== Roster ==
No.	Nat.	Player	Class	Pos	Height	Weight	DoB	Hometown	Previous team
		Eberle		D
		LePage		LW
		Parks		RW
		Rogers		G
		Colin Thistlewaite (C)		D
		John Travers		C

== Standings ==
1920–21 College ice hockey standings
	Intercollegiate							Overall					
	GP	W	L	T	Pct.	GF	GA	GP	W	L	T	GF	GA
Amherst	7	0	7	0	.000	8	19	7	0	7	0	8	19
Army	3	0	2	1	.167	6	11	3	0	2	1	6	11
Bates	4	2	2	0	.500	7	8	8	4	4	0	22	20
Boston College	7	6	1	0	.857	27	11	8	6	2	0	28	18
Bowdoin	4	0	3	1	.125	1	10	7	1	5	1	10	23
Buffalo	–	–	–	–	–	–	–	6	0	6	0	–	–
Carnegie Tech	5	0	4	1	.100	4	18	5	0	4	1	4	18
Clarkson	1	0	1	0	.000	1	6	3	2	1	0	12	14
Colgate	4	1	3	0	.250	8	14	5	2	3	0	9	14
Columbia	5	1	4	0	.200	21	24	5	1	4	0	21	24
Cornell	5	3	2	0	.600	22	10	5	3	2	0	22	10
Dartmouth	9	5	3	1	.611	24	21	11	6	4	1	30	27
Fordham	–	–	–	–	–	–	–	–	–	–	–	–	–
Hamilton	–	–	–	–	–	–	–	10	10	0	0	–	–
Harvard	6	6	0	0	1.000	42	3	10	8	2	0	55	8
Massachusetts Agricultural	7	3	4	0	.429	18	17	7	3	4	0	18	17
Michigan College of Mines	2	1	1	0	.500	9	5	10	6	4	0	29	21
MIT	6	3	3	0	.500	13	21	7	3	4	0	16	25
New York State	–	–	–	–	–	–	–	–	–	–	–	–	–
Notre Dame	3	2	1	0	.667	7	9	3	2	1	0	7	9
Pennsylvania	8	3	4	1	.438	17	37	9	3	5	1	18	44
Princeton	7	4	3	0	.571	18	16	8	4	4	0	20	23
Rensselaer	4	1	3	0	.250	7	13	4	1	3	0	7	13
Tufts	–	–	–	–	–	–	–	–	–	–	–	–	–
Williams	5	4	1	0	.800	17	10	6	5	1	0	21	10
Yale	8	3	4	1	.438	21	33	10	3	6	1	25	47
YMCA College	6	5	0	1	.917	17	9	7	5	1	1	20	16

== Schedule and results ==
Date	Opponent	Site	Result	Record
Regular Season
January 3	at Calumet Seniors*	Calumet Colosseum • Calumet, Michigan	W 4–1	1–0–0
January 27	at Michigan ^{†}*	Weinberg Coliseum • Ann Arbor, Michigan	W 3–0	2–0–0
January 28	at Michigan ^{†}*	Weinberg Coliseum • Ann Arbor, Michigan	L 3–4	2–1–0
February 1	vs. Houghton Legion*	Amphidrome • Houghton, Michigan	W 2–1	3–1–0
February 3	Notre Dame*	Amphidrome • Houghton, Michigan	W 7–2	4–1–0
February 4	vs. Notre Dame*	Calumet Colosseum • Calumet, Michigan	L 2–3	4–2–0
March 8	at Portage Lake*	Portage Lake • Portage Lake, Michigan	L 0–5	4–3–0
March 15	at Calumet Seniors*	Calumet Colosseum • Calumet, Michigan	W 3–0	5–3–0
March 18	at Calumet Seniors*	Calumet Colosseum • Calumet, Michigan	W 3–2	6–3–0
March 21	at Chassell*	Chassell, Michigan	L 2–3	6–4–0
*Non-conference game.

† Michigan did not field a varsity team at this time.
