= 1920–21 Yale Bulldogs men's ice hockey season =

College ice hockey season

- Conference: 3rd THL
- Home ice: Philadelphia Auditorium and Ice Palace

Record
- Overall: 3–6–1
- Conference: 0–4–0
- Road: 2–3–0
- Neutral: 2–2–0

Coaches and captains
- Head coach: Francis Bangs
- Captain: Robert Carson

The 1920–21 Yale Bulldogs men's ice hockey season was the 26th season of play for the program.

== Season ==
Before the start of the season Yale and five other elite programs (Cornell, Dartmouth, Harvard, Pennsylvania and Princeton) met to organize a new hockey league. Issues arose from some potential members, namely Harvard, and instead of a formal league a loose association was formed in order to discuss issues, settle arguments and facilitate scheduling.

After Talbot Hunter's sudden departure from the team the program brought in former player Francis Bangs as coach. Unfortunately, the team was still having to use the Philadelphia Ice Palace in lieu of a home arena since the temporary rinks that were built on the Whitney Avenue tennis courts proved insufficient. After opening up with two losses before Christmas, Yale headed to Pittsburgh to face Carnegie Tech for the first time in over a decade. The Tartans had just brought their program back and were hardly a match for the experienced Bulldogs but the Tartans showed promise.

Yale won a third consecutive game against another program that returned after several years away (Columbia) but when they faced stiffer competition, the Elis were unable to raise their game. In their final five game of the season, Yale managed only 3 goals and surrendered 28. Their best performance came against Dartmouth when the two teams played a scoreless contest although the game was called due to poor ice conditions. Yale lost all four of its Triangular Hockey League games and finished the season with a very poor record.

In the two games against Harvard and the Dartmouth match, Yale's opponents insisted on playing 7–on-7. Records indicate these were the final games played by Yale under the old format as all colleges switched to the more popular 6-on-6 style the following season.

== Roster ==
No.	Nat.	Player	Class	Pos	Height	Weight	DoB	Hometown	Previous team
		R. M. Bassett	Senior	G
		Jonathan O. Bulkley	Sophomore	R/C/LW
		Robert Carson III (C)	Senior	R/D/C/RW	5' 5" (1.65 m)	125 lb (57 kg)			St. Paul's School
		Allen C. Diefendorf	Senior	G
		Lawrence Foster	Senior	LW/RW					St. Paul's School
		Reginald Foster Jr.	Junior	RW
		Clement A. Griscom III	Junior	LW/D
		Fergus Reid Jr.	Sophomore	LW/RW
	(United States)	Wells Root		G			1900-03-21	Buffalo, New York
		Winfield Shiras	Sophomore	LW
		Edward H. Van Ingen Jr.	Senior	D			1898-10-18

== Standings ==
1920–21 College ice hockey standings
	Intercollegiate							Overall					
	GP	W	L	T	Pct.	GF	GA	GP	W	L	T	GF	GA
Amherst	7	0	7	0	.000	8	19	7	0	7	0	8	19
Army	3	0	2	1	.167	6	11	3	0	2	1	6	11
Bates	4	2	2	0	.500	7	8	8	4	4	0	22	20
Boston College	7	6	1	0	.857	27	11	8	6	2	0	28	18
Bowdoin	4	0	3	1	.125	1	10	7	1	5	1	10	23
Buffalo	–	–	–	–	–	–	–	6	0	6	0	–	–
Carnegie Tech	5	0	4	1	.100	4	18	5	0	4	1	4	18
Clarkson	1	0	1	0	.000	1	6	3	2	1	0	12	14
Colgate	4	1	3	0	.250	8	14	5	2	3	0	9	14
Columbia	5	1	4	0	.200	21	24	5	1	4	0	21	24
Cornell	5	3	2	0	.600	22	10	5	3	2	0	22	10
Dartmouth	9	5	3	1	.611	24	21	11	6	4	1	30	27
Fordham	–	–	–	–	–	–	–	–	–	–	–	–	–
Hamilton	–	–	–	–	–	–	–	10	10	0	0	–	–
Harvard	6	6	0	0	1.000	42	3	10	8	2	0	55	8
Massachusetts Agricultural	7	3	4	0	.429	18	17	7	3	4	0	18	17
Michigan College of Mines	2	1	1	0	.500	9	5	10	6	4	0	29	21
MIT	6	3	3	0	.500	13	21	7	3	4	0	16	25
New York State	–	–	–	–	–	–	–	–	–	–	–	–	–
Notre Dame	3	2	1	0	.667	7	9	3	2	1	0	7	9
Pennsylvania	8	3	4	1	.438	17	37	9	3	5	1	18	44
Princeton	7	4	3	0	.571	18	16	8	4	4	0	20	23
Rensselaer	4	1	3	0	.250	7	13	4	1	3	0	7	13
Tufts	–	–	–	–	–	–	–	–	–	–	–	–	–
Williams	5	4	1	0	.800	17	10	6	5	1	0	21	10
Yale	8	3	4	1	.438	21	33	10	3	6	1	25	47
YMCA College	6	5	0	1	.917	17	9	7	5	1	1	20	16

1920–21 Triangular Hockey League standings
	Conference								Overall					
	GP	W	L	T	PTS	SW	GF	GA	GP	W	L	T	GF	GA
Harvard *	3	3	0	0	1.000	2	27	1	10	8	2	0	55	8
Princeton	3	2	1	0	.667	1	8	9	8	4	4	0	20	23
Yale	4	0	4	0	.000	0	3	28	10	3	6	1	25	47
* indicates conference champion

== Schedule and results ==
Date	Opponent	Site	Result	Record
Regular season
December 21	vs. Quaker City Hockey Club*	Philadelphia Ice Palace • Philadelphia, Pennsylvania	L 1–7	0–1–0
December 22	vs. St. Paul's School*	Philadelphia Ice Palace • Philadelphia, Pennsylvania	L 3–7	0–2–0
December 31	at Carnegie Tech*	Duquesne Garden • Pittsburgh, Pennsylvania	W 5–0	1–2–0
January 1	at Carnegie Tech*	Duquesne Garden • Pittsburgh, Pennsylvania	W 6–0	2–2–0
January 15	at Columbia*	181st Street Ice Palace • New York, New York	W 7–5	3–2–0
January 22	vs. Princeton	Philadelphia Ice Palace • Philadelphia, Pennsylvania	L 2–4 ^{OT}	3–3–0 (0–1–0)
February 5	vs. Harvard	Philadelphia Ice Palace • Philadelphia, Pennsylvania (Rivalry)	L 0–7	3–4–0 (0–2–0)
February 12	at Dartmouth*	Hanover, New Hampshire	T 0–0 †	3–4–1
February 19	vs. Princeton	Boston Arena • Boston, Massachusetts	L 0–4	3–5–1 (0–3–0)
February 26	at Harvard	Boston Arena • Boston, Massachusetts (Rivalry)	L 1–13	3–6–1 (0–4–0)
*Non-conference game.

† The match was called after only three minutes had elapsed in the second period due to extremely poor ice conditions.
