= 1920–21 Columbia Lions men's ice hockey season =

- Home ice: 181st Street Ice Palace

Record
- Overall: 1–4–0
- Home: 1–3–0
- Road: 0–1–0

Coaches and captains
- Head coach: Coach Harrison
- Captain: Ewen C. Anderson

The 1920–21 Columbia Lions men's ice hockey season was the 20th season of play for the program.

== Season ==
After resigning from the Intercollegiate Hockey Association in 1912 the ice hockey team had difficulties scheduling games due to no longer having the St. Nicholas Rink as a venue. The team was unable to play a single game in either 1916 or 1917 and while a group of students did manage to play four games during the 1917–18 season, it was done informally and not as representatives of Columbia University. In 1920 an effort was made to revive the team and the 181st Street Ice Palace was secured as a practice facility. Once enough interest had been demonstrated and a team was formed, manager A. L. Walker Jr. put together a tentative schedule.

Columbia opened its season against Yale and, unsurprisingly for a team that hadn't played in six seasons, lost 5–7. The Lions took more than two weeks to play their next game and, once they did, they found themselves on a sheet of ice nearly double the size of their practice rink. In their game against Williams the team began well, leading 1–0 after the first, but slumped badly in the middle frame, allowing 5 goals and losing any chance they had at winning their first game of the season.

After letting another early lead slip away against Cornell a lineup change seemed to give Columbia the spark they needed and the Lions mauled Colgate 11–3, winning their first game in over six years.

== Roster ==
No.	Nat.	Player	Class	Pos	Height	Weight	DoB	Hometown	Previous team
		Ewen C. Anderson (C)	Junior	D					Montclair High School
		Marshall W. Baldwin	Freshman	F/D
		Church		C
		William C. Kopper	Freshman	G
		Park		D
		James R. Rivet	Sophomore	C/D
		Walter Rollins	Sophomore	LW
		Neil Skelton	Freshman	G
		Warren M. Squires	Junior	D
		Walker		C/RW

== Standings ==
1920–21 College ice hockey standings
	Intercollegiate							Overall					
	GP	W	L	T	Pct.	GF	GA	GP	W	L	T	GF	GA
Amherst	7	0	7	0	.000	8	19	7	0	7	0	8	19
Army	3	0	2	1	.167	6	11	3	0	2	1	6	11
Bates	4	2	2	0	.500	7	8	8	4	4	0	22	20
Boston College	7	6	1	0	.857	27	11	8	6	2	0	28	18
Bowdoin	4	0	3	1	.125	1	10	7	1	5	1	10	23
Buffalo	–	–	–	–	–	–	–	6	0	6	0	–	–
Carnegie Tech	5	0	4	1	.100	4	18	5	0	4	1	4	18
Clarkson	1	0	1	0	.000	1	6	3	2	1	0	12	14
Colgate	4	1	3	0	.250	8	14	5	2	3	0	9	14
Columbia	5	1	4	0	.200	21	24	5	1	4	0	21	24
Cornell	5	3	2	0	.600	22	10	5	3	2	0	22	10
Dartmouth	9	5	3	1	.611	24	21	11	6	4	1	30	27
Fordham	–	–	–	–	–	–	–	–	–	–	–	–	–
Hamilton	–	–	–	–	–	–	–	10	10	0	0	–	–
Harvard	6	6	0	0	1.000	42	3	10	8	2	0	55	8
Massachusetts Agricultural	7	3	4	0	.429	18	17	7	3	4	0	18	17
Michigan College of Mines	2	1	1	0	.500	9	5	10	6	4	0	29	21
MIT	6	3	3	0	.500	13	21	7	3	4	0	16	25
New York State	–	–	–	–	–	–	–	–	–	–	–	–	–
Notre Dame	3	2	1	0	.667	7	9	3	2	1	0	7	9
Pennsylvania	8	3	4	1	.438	17	37	9	3	5	1	18	44
Princeton	7	4	3	0	.571	18	16	8	4	4	0	20	23
Rensselaer	4	1	3	0	.250	7	13	4	1	3	0	7	13
Tufts	–	–	–	–	–	–	–	–	–	–	–	–	–
Williams	5	4	1	0	.800	17	10	6	5	1	0	21	10
Yale	8	3	4	1	.438	21	33	10	3	6	1	25	47
YMCA College	6	5	0	1	.917	17	9	7	5	1	1	20	16

== Schedule and results ==
Date	Opponent	Site	Result	Record
Regular Season
January 15	Yale*	181st Street Ice Palace • New York, New York	L 5–7	0–1–0
February 2	at Pennsylvania*	Philadelphia Ice Palace • Philadelphia, Pennsylvania	L 0–2	0–2–0
February 11	Williams*	181st Street Ice Palace • New York, New York	L 1–5	0–3–0
February 19	Cornell*	181st Street Ice Palace • New York, New York	L 4–7	0–4–0
February 26	Colgate*	181st Street Ice Palace • New York, New York	W 11–3	1–4–0
*Non-conference game.

== Scoring Statistics ==
Name	Position	Games	Goals
Walker	C/RW	5	7
Ewen Anderson	D	5	7
Walter Rollins	LW	5	4
James Rivet	C/D	5	2
Baldwin	F/D	3	1
Church	C	1	0
Park	D	1	0
Neil Skelton	G	2	0
Warren Squires	D	4	0
Harry Kopper	G	4	0
Total			21

Note: Assists were not recorded as a statistic.
