= 1920–21 Amherst men's ice hockey season =

- Conference: Independent
- Home ice: Pratt Field

Record
- Overall: 0–7–0
- Home: 0–1–0
- Road: 0–5–0
- Neutral: 0–1–0

Coaches and captains
- Captain: Allen Davidson
- Alternate captain: Leon Plumer

The 1920–21 Amherst men's ice hockey season was the 8th season of play for the program.

== Season ==
Amherst had high hoped for its first full season since 1914 and got to work right after the football season was finished. Pratt Field was once again the team's home and once the rink had finished freezing, the prospective players were put through their paces. However, after returning from the exam break, several players (including Leon Plumer) were ruled academically ineligible and would not be able to play for the rest of the season.

The handicapped purple opened their season against one of the nation's top teams in Dartmouth. Though they lost, Amherst showed a solid level of compete by keeping the score close. A few days later, the team got its first home game of the season and met cross-town rivals Massachusetts Agricultural. Goaltender Francis Plimpton was the star for Amherst but he was unable to help the team with its biggest problem: scoring. The purple were only able to get six shots on goal for the entire game and, although Davidson was able to get one marker, it wasn't enough and the team lost 1–2. The next game had virtually the same outcome with Davidson getting the only goal for Amherst in a 1–2 loss and it was becoming quite apparent that the missing talent was holding the team back.

A week later, Amherst was off to play YMCA College and the team got off to a fast start. The purple got an early lead but were unable to build on the advantage. YMCA tied the game in the second half but Plimpton prevented any further scoring and the two went into overtime. The Maroons struck quick and took the lead, then held Amherst off for the remainder of the match. Two more losses in quick succession left the team with just one final opportunity to get a win. Unfortunately, the offense wasn't able to get anything going in the rematch with Williams and Amherst ended the year with a perfect losing season.

Bradford L. Church served as team manager with Frank A. Myers as his assistant.

Note: Amherst teams did not have any nickname prior to 1921.

== Roster ==
No.	Nat.	Player	Class	Pos	Height	Weight	DoB	Hometown	Previous team
	(United States)	John E. Booth	Sophomore	G				Brooklyn, New York
	(United States)	Albert E. Burgess	Sophomore	G				Cambridge, Massachusetts
	(United States)	Remington A. Clark	Senior	R				Springfield, Massachusetts
	(United States)	Allen Davidson (C)	Junior	C			1901-08-04	Auburndale, Massachusetts
	(United States)	Robert K. Metcalf	Senior	LW			1899-11-21	Arlington, Massachusetts
	(United States)	Horace S. G. Murnane	Senior	LW			1899-02-15	Brookline, Massachusetts
	(United States)	Francis T. P. Plimpton	Senior	G			1900-12-07	Manhattan, New York
	(United States)	Albert L. Sylvester Jr.	Freshman	LW			1903-05-06	Norwell, Massachusetts
	(United States)	George L. Titus	Freshman	RW			1903-01-30	Brooklyn, New York
	(United States)	Charles S. Wilcox	Sophomore	D			1901-11-22	Rochester, New York
	(United States)	John N. Worcester	Senior	D			1899-12-18	Cambridge, Massachusetts

== Standings ==
1920–21 College ice hockey standings
	Intercollegiate							Overall					
	GP	W	L	T	Pct.	GF	GA	GP	W	L	T	GF	GA
Amherst	7	0	7	0	.000	8	19	7	0	7	0	8	19
Army	3	0	2	1	.167	6	11	3	0	2	1	6	11
Bates	4	2	2	0	.500	7	8	8	4	4	0	22	20
Boston College	7	6	1	0	.857	27	11	8	6	2	0	28	18
Bowdoin	4	0	3	1	.125	1	10	7	1	5	1	10	23
Buffalo	–	–	–	–	–	–	–	6	0	6	0	–	–
Carnegie Tech	5	0	4	1	.100	4	18	5	0	4	1	4	18
Clarkson	1	0	1	0	.000	1	6	3	2	1	0	12	14
Colgate	4	1	3	0	.250	8	14	5	2	3	0	9	14
Columbia	5	1	4	0	.200	21	24	5	1	4	0	21	24
Cornell	5	3	2	0	.600	22	10	5	3	2	0	22	10
Dartmouth	9	5	3	1	.611	24	21	11	6	4	1	30	27
Fordham	–	–	–	–	–	–	–	–	–	–	–	–	–
Hamilton	–	–	–	–	–	–	–	10	10	0	0	–	–
Harvard	6	6	0	0	1.000	42	3	10	8	2	0	55	8
Massachusetts Agricultural	7	3	4	0	.429	18	17	7	3	4	0	18	17
Michigan College of Mines	2	1	1	0	.500	9	5	10	6	4	0	29	21
MIT	6	3	3	0	.500	13	21	7	3	4	0	16	25
New York State	–	–	–	–	–	–	–	–	–	–	–	–	–
Notre Dame	3	2	1	0	.667	7	9	3	2	1	0	7	9
Pennsylvania	8	3	4	1	.438	17	37	9	3	5	1	18	44
Princeton	7	4	3	0	.571	18	16	8	4	4	0	20	23
Rensselaer	4	1	3	0	.250	7	13	4	1	3	0	7	13
Tufts	–	–	–	–	–	–	–	–	–	–	–	–	–
Williams	5	4	1	0	.800	17	10	6	5	1	0	21	10
Yale	8	3	4	1	.438	21	33	10	3	6	1	25	47
YMCA College	6	5	0	1	.917	17	9	7	5	1	1	20	16

== Schedule and results ==
Date	Opponent	Site	Result	Record
Regular Season
January 8	at Dartmouth*	Occom Pond • Hanover, New Hampshire	L 2–4	0–1–0
January 12	at Massachusetts Agricultural*	Alumni Field Rink • Amherst, Massachusetts	L 1–2	0–2–0
January 19	Williams*	Pratt Field Rink • Amherst, Massachusetts	L 1–2	0–3–0
January 22	at YMCA College*	Pratt Field Rink • Springfield, Massachusetts	L 1–2 ^{2OT}	0–4–0
January 28	vs. MIT*	Brae Burn Rink • West Newton, Massachusetts	L 1–2	0–5–0
January 29	at Boston College*	Boston Arena • Boston, Massachusetts	L 2–4	0–6–0
February 4	at Williams*	Cole Field House Rink • Williamstown, Massachusetts	L 0–3	0–7–0
*Non-conference game.
