= 1920–21 Bowdoin Polar Bears men's ice hockey season =

- Conference: Independent
- Home ice: Delta Rink

Record
- Overall: 1–5–1
- Home: 1–3–0
- Road: 0–2–1

Coaches and captains
- Captain: Allen Morrell

The 1920–21 Bowdoin Polar Bears men's ice hockey season was the 2nd season of play for the program.

== Season ==
Due to on-campus improvements, particularly on the stretch of land where the team's rink had been the previous year, The school made plans to build a new rink on the nearby river delta. Quite literally, the biggest change that resulted from this was the larger skating surface that would result. The new rink would measure 180' by 90' and, though it was still smaller than a standard rink size, it was more than double the area that the Hyde Hall Rink had provided. The team put together a schedule of 8 games, however, warm weather caused the match on January 6 to be cancelled. The weather did not cool off over the next week so the team's first official contest against Tufts had to be played on the Portland Country Club Rink. The rainy conditions led to a 0–0 final score as both squads could hardly move the puck from puddle to puddle in only 30 minutes of game time.

Conditions were better for the next game but the result was worse. In spite of the addition of Stonemetz and Palmer to the lineup, the later of which scored the first goal of the season for Bowdoin, the Polar Bears lost 1–4. The team's first game on the Delta Rink ended without a single Bowdoin goal and they lost to rival Bates 0–4. During the exam break, Portland C.C. came to the Delta for a rematch but the time off didn't appear to help Bowdoin as they allowed 8 goals to their opponents. Morrell's move to wing helped spark the offense but caused the defense to turn into a sieve.

Warm weather forced the cancellation of several more games and Bowdoin wasn't able to get back on the ice until the 19th. This time, however, they were able to skate away in triumph after defeating the Association of St. Dominiques. The next two games came in short order and, with Morrell back on defense, the team was unable to score. Bowdoin managed just one goal in the two games and ended the season on a sour note.

== Roster ==
No.	Nat.	Player	Class	Pos	Height	Weight	DoB	Hometown	Previous team
	(United States)	Romeo A. Beliveau	Senior	R/C/LW			1896-08-21	Lewiston, Maine
	(United States)	Malcolm W. Burr	Sophomore	R/RW			1901-07-29	Boston, Massachusetts
	(United States)	L. Arthur Daviau	Sophomore	R/C			1901-03-12	Waterville, Maine
	(United States)	John F. Handy	Sophomore	G/D			1895-12-05	Worcester, Massachusetts
	(United States)	Alonzo B. Holmes	Senior	D/F			1896-09-30	Avon, Maine
	(United States)	Arthur J. D. Miguel	Freshman	G			1901-08-29	Cambridge, Massachusetts
	(United States)	Allen E. Morrell (C)	Junior	D/RW			1897-07-07	Hyde Park, Massachusetts
	(United States)	Stephen Palmer	Sophomore	RW			1900-12-21	Newton, Massachusetts
	(United States)	Adolphe J. Provost	Freshman	R/LW			1898-10-20	Auburn, Maine
	(United States)	Preston M. Putnam	Freshman	D			1902-08-20	Danvers, Massachusetts
	(United States)	Raymond G. Putnam	Junior	D/LW			1900-05-05	Danvers, Massachusetts
	(United States)	Harold T. Stonemetz	Sophomore	D/C			1901-01-26	Newton, Massachusetts
	(United States)	Elmer N. Swinglehurst	Sophomore	RW			1901-10-27	Philadelphia, Pennsylvania
	(United States)	Victor S. Whitman	Sophomore	R/W			1901-04-05	Canton, Maine
	(United States)	Merritt L. Willson	Sophomore	D			1899-09-27	Sussex, New Jersey
	(United States)	Douglas W. Young	Freshman	RW			1903-12-04	Boston, Massachusetts

== Standings ==
1920–21 College ice hockey standings
	Intercollegiate							Overall					
	GP	W	L	T	Pct.	GF	GA	GP	W	L	T	GF	GA
Amherst	7	0	7	0	.000	8	19	7	0	7	0	8	19
Army	3	0	2	1	.167	6	11	3	0	2	1	6	11
Bates	4	2	2	0	.500	7	8	8	4	4	0	22	20
Boston College	7	6	1	0	.857	27	11	8	6	2	0	28	18
Bowdoin	4	0	3	1	.125	1	10	7	1	5	1	10	23
Buffalo	–	–	–	–	–	–	–	6	0	6	0	–	–
Carnegie Tech	5	0	4	1	.100	4	18	5	0	4	1	4	18
Clarkson	1	0	1	0	.000	1	6	3	2	1	0	12	14
Colgate	4	1	3	0	.250	8	14	5	2	3	0	9	14
Columbia	5	1	4	0	.200	21	24	5	1	4	0	21	24
Cornell	5	3	2	0	.600	22	10	5	3	2	0	22	10
Dartmouth	9	5	3	1	.611	24	21	11	6	4	1	30	27
Fordham	–	–	–	–	–	–	–	–	–	–	–	–	–
Hamilton	–	–	–	–	–	–	–	10	10	0	0	–	–
Harvard	6	6	0	0	1.000	42	3	10	8	2	0	55	8
Massachusetts Agricultural	7	3	4	0	.429	18	17	7	3	4	0	18	17
Michigan College of Mines	2	1	1	0	.500	9	5	10	6	4	0	29	21
MIT	6	3	3	0	.500	13	21	7	3	4	0	16	25
New York State	–	–	–	–	–	–	–	–	–	–	–	–	–
Notre Dame	3	2	1	0	.667	7	9	3	2	1	0	7	9
Pennsylvania	8	3	4	1	.438	17	37	9	3	5	1	18	44
Princeton	7	4	3	0	.571	18	16	8	4	4	0	20	23
Rensselaer	4	1	3	0	.250	7	13	4	1	3	0	7	13
Tufts	–	–	–	–	–	–	–	–	–	–	–	–	–
Williams	5	4	1	0	.800	17	10	6	5	1	0	21	10
Yale	8	3	4	1	.438	21	33	10	3	6	1	25	47
YMCA College	6	5	0	1	.917	17	9	7	5	1	1	20	16

== Schedule and results ==
Date	Opponent	Site	Result	Record
Regular Season
January 14	at Tufts*	Country Club Rink • Portland, Maine	T 0–0	0–0–1
January 19	at Portland Country Club*	Country Club Rink • Portland, Maine	L 1–4	1–1–0
January 22	Bates*	Delta Rink • Brunswick, Maine	L 0–4	0–2–1
February 2	Portland Country Club*	Delta Rink • Brunswick, Maine	L 4–8	0–3–1
February 19	St. Dominiques*	Delta Rink • Brunswick, Maine	W 4–1	1–3–1
February 22	at Bates*	Lake Andrews Rink • Lewiston, Maine	L 0–2 ^{†}	1–4–1
February 26	YMCA College*	Delta Rink • Brunswick, Maine	L 1–4	1–5–1
*Non-conference game.

† Bates records have the score of the game as 1–2 in their favor.

== Scoring statistics ==
Name	Position	Games	Goals
Adolphe Provost	R/LW	5	3
Victor Whitman	R/LW/RW	7	3
Allen Morrell	P/CP/RW	7	2
Stephen Palmer	RW	2	1
Alonzo Holmes	CP/C/RW	5	1
Elmer Swinglehurst	RW	1	0
Merritt Wilson	P	1	0
Malcolm Burr	R/RW	2	0
Preston Putnam	CP	2	0
Douglas Young	RW	2	0
Arthur Daviau	R/C	3	0
Romeo Beliveau	R/C/LW	4	0
Harold Stonemetz	P/CP/C	5	0
John Handy	G/P	6	0
Raymond Putnam	P/CP/RW	6	0
Arthur Miguel	G	7	0
Total			10

Note: The scorer of the second goal in the game on January 24 was not recorded.
