= 1920–21 Carnegie Tech Tartans men's ice hockey season =

- Home ice: Duquesne Garden

Record
- Overall: 0–4–1
- Home: 0–3–1
- Road: 0–1–0

Coaches and captains
- Head coach: Major Gordon
- Captain: Percy Jewell

The 1920–21 Carnegie Tech Tartans men's ice hockey season was the 6th season of play for the program.

== Season ==
After having remained dormant for a decade, Carnegie Tech revived its ice hockey program in 1920. They played two opponents twice each and as the team possessed very little experience with the game the team wasn't expected to win. They did, however, give Penn a challenge for the battle of Pennsylvania, pushing the Quakers into overtime and earning a tie in their first match. With that surprising result, Carnegie Tech was looking forward to what a second season would bring.

== Roster ==
No.	Nat.	Player	Class	Pos	Height	Weight	DoB	Hometown	Previous team
		Percy W. Jewell (C)	Senior
	(United States)	Robert W. Schmertz	Senior				1898-03-04	Pittsburgh, Pennsylvania

== Standings ==
1920–21 College ice hockey standings
	Intercollegiate							Overall					
	GP	W	L	T	Pct.	GF	GA	GP	W	L	T	GF	GA
Amherst	7	0	7	0	.000	8	19	7	0	7	0	8	19
Army	3	0	2	1	.167	6	11	3	0	2	1	6	11
Bates	4	2	2	0	.500	7	8	8	4	4	0	22	20
Boston College	7	6	1	0	.857	27	11	8	6	2	0	28	18
Bowdoin	4	0	3	1	.125	1	10	7	1	5	1	10	23
Buffalo	–	–	–	–	–	–	–	6	0	6	0	–	–
Carnegie Tech	5	0	4	1	.100	4	18	5	0	4	1	4	18
Clarkson	1	0	1	0	.000	1	6	3	2	1	0	12	14
Colgate	4	1	3	0	.250	8	14	5	2	3	0	9	14
Columbia	5	1	4	0	.200	21	24	5	1	4	0	21	24
Cornell	5	3	2	0	.600	22	10	5	3	2	0	22	10
Dartmouth	9	5	3	1	.611	24	21	11	6	4	1	30	27
Fordham	–	–	–	–	–	–	–	–	–	–	–	–	–
Hamilton	–	–	–	–	–	–	–	10	10	0	0	–	–
Harvard	6	6	0	0	1.000	42	3	10	8	2	0	55	8
Massachusetts Agricultural	7	3	4	0	.429	18	17	7	3	4	0	18	17
Michigan College of Mines	2	1	1	0	.500	9	5	10	6	4	0	29	21
MIT	6	3	3	0	.500	13	21	7	3	4	0	16	25
New York State	–	–	–	–	–	–	–	–	–	–	–	–	–
Notre Dame	3	2	1	0	.667	7	9	3	2	1	0	7	9
Pennsylvania	8	3	4	1	.438	17	37	9	3	5	1	18	44
Princeton	7	4	3	0	.571	18	16	8	4	4	0	20	23
Rensselaer	4	1	3	0	.250	7	13	4	1	3	0	7	13
Tufts	–	–	–	–	–	–	–	–	–	–	–	–	–
Williams	5	4	1	0	.800	17	10	6	5	1	0	21	10
Yale	8	3	4	1	.438	21	33	10	3	6	1	25	47
YMCA College	6	5	0	1	.917	17	9	7	5	1	1	20	16

== Schedule and results ==
Date	Opponent	Site	Result	Record
Regular Season
December 31	Yale*	Duquesne Garden • Pittsburgh, Pennsylvania	L 0–5	0–1–0
January 1	Yale*	Duquesne Garden • Pittsburgh, Pennsylvania	L 0–6	0–2–0
January 28	Pennsylvania*	Duquesne Garden • Pittsburgh, Pennsylvania	T 3–3 ^{2OT}	0–2–1
February 9	Notre Dame*	Duquesne Garden • Pittsburgh, Pennsylvania	L 0–2	0–3–1
February 22	at Pennsylvania*	Philadelphia Ice Palace • Philadelphia, Pennsylvania	L 1–2	0–4–1
*Non-conference game.
