= 1920–21 Cornell Big Red men's ice hockey season =

Intercollegiate hockey season

- Home ice: Beebe Lake

Record
- Overall: 3–2–0
- Home: 2–1–0
- Road: 1–1–0

Coaches and captains
- Head coach: Nick Bawlf
- Captain: T. D. Finn

The 1920–21 Cornell Big Red men's ice hockey season was the 16th season of play for the program. The teams was coached by Nick Bawlf in his 1st season.

== Season ==
After World War I, the continued interest in ice hockey prompted Cornell to restart its varsity program. The school brought in Nick Bawlf to head the program as well as the lacrosse and soccer teams, and he set about rebuilding the Big Red. The biggest impediment for the program, as it had been before the war, was the lack of an ice rink either on campus or otherwise. The team was forced to use Beebe Lake despite several attempts to build artificial rinks. Weather would be a constant source of frustration for the men's team for the next 37 years.

Cornell's season began against Hamilton and, unsurprisingly, the team lost its first game in almost 5 years. The Big Red went scoreless but they did keep the game close, losing 0–2 in front of a good-sized crowd. In the game Cornell eschewed the rover position, deciding to go with the updated rules that had only six players on each side. The second game a week later had a much better result for the team. After small adjustments to the lineup, Cornell scored 10 goals in the 40-minute match to get their first win since 1916.

After the win the team didn't play another game until mid-February due to semester exams. When the team rejoined several changes had been made. Their goaltender Whitehall had been replaced by Kaw while Rollo and McDonald were gone from the team. The changed didn't prevent the Big Red from winning as they defeated Colgate in their final home game and prepared for a renewal with a pair of old rivals. Pennsylvania was making their third attempt at a varsity team but now the squad had access to a home rink. Cornell played its first game at a proper ice rink when they arrived for a game at the Philadelphia Ice Palace. The two sides were evenly matched and finished regulation tied 3–3. Penn scored a goal in the waning minutes of overtime and Cornell couldn't produce the equalizer with little time remained. Their final game of the year came a week later against Columbia, who were returning to the game after a longer layoff than Cornell. The game was close early but Cornell surged at the end, scoring 4 goals late to win 7–4, ending their season with a winning record.

M. G. Sullivan served as team manager.

== Roster ==
| No. | Nat. | Player | Class | Pos | Height | Weight | DoB | Hometown | Previous team |
|---|---|---|---|---|---|---|---|---|---|
| | (United States) | Gardner Barker | | RW | | | | Chatham, New York |
| | | William Betts | | LW/D |
| | (United States) | Colwell Carney | | F | | | | Marlboro, New York |
| | (United States) | Thomas D. Finn (C) | Junior | LW/D | | | | Exeter, New Hampshire |
| | (United States) | Edgar L. Kaw | | G | | | 1897-01-18 | Houston, Texas |
| | (United States) | Henry Kerr Jr. | | | | | | Evanston, Illinois |
| | | McDonald |
| | | Rollo | | D |
| | (United States) | George H. Thornton | | C | | | | New York, New York |
| | (Mexico) | Arthur Tuttle Jr. | | D | | | | Parral, Mexico |
| | (United States) | Stanley Wight | | G | | | | Detroit, Michigan |
| | | Whitehall | | G |
| | (United States) | Harold Young | | D | | | | Bloomfield, New Jersey |

== Standings ==
1920–21 College ice hockey standings
| | Intercollegiate | | | | | | | Overall | | | | | |
| | GP | W | L | T | Pct. | GF | GA | GP | W | L | T | GF | GA |
|---|---|---|---|---|---|---|---|---|---|---|---|---|---|
| Amherst | 7 | 0 | 7 | 0 | .000 | 8 | 19 | 7 | 0 | 7 | 0 | 8 | 19 |
| Army | 3 | 0 | 2 | 1 | .167 | 6 | 11 | 3 | 0 | 2 | 1 | 6 | 11 |
| Bates | 4 | 2 | 2 | 0 | .500 | 7 | 8 | 8 | 4 | 4 | 0 | 22 | 20 |
| Boston College | 7 | 6 | 1 | 0 | .857 | 27 | 11 | 8 | 6 | 2 | 0 | 28 | 18 |
| Bowdoin | 4 | 0 | 3 | 1 | .125 | 1 | 10 | 7 | 1 | 5 | 1 | 10 | 23 |
| Buffalo | – | – | – | – | – | – | – | 6 | 0 | 6 | 0 | – | – |
| Carnegie Tech | 5 | 0 | 4 | 1 | .100 | 4 | 18 | 5 | 0 | 4 | 1 | 4 | 18 |
| Clarkson | 1 | 0 | 1 | 0 | .000 | 1 | 6 | 3 | 2 | 1 | 0 | 12 | 14 |
| Colgate | 4 | 1 | 3 | 0 | .250 | 8 | 14 | 5 | 2 | 3 | 0 | 9 | 14 |
| Columbia | 5 | 1 | 4 | 0 | .200 | 21 | 24 | 5 | 1 | 4 | 0 | 21 | 24 |
| Cornell | 5 | 3 | 2 | 0 | .600 | 22 | 10 | 5 | 3 | 2 | 0 | 22 | 10 |
| Dartmouth | 9 | 5 | 3 | 1 | .611 | 24 | 21 | 11 | 6 | 4 | 1 | 30 | 27 |
| Fordham | – | – | – | – | – | – | – | – | – | – | – | – | – |
| Hamilton | – | – | – | – | – | – | – | 10 | 10 | 0 | 0 | – | – |
| Harvard | 6 | 6 | 0 | 0 | 1.000 | 42 | 3 | 10 | 8 | 2 | 0 | 55 | 8 |
| Massachusetts Agricultural | 7 | 3 | 4 | 0 | .429 | 18 | 17 | 7 | 3 | 4 | 0 | 18 | 17 |
| Michigan College of Mines | 2 | 1 | 1 | 0 | .500 | 9 | 5 | 10 | 6 | 4 | 0 | 29 | 21 |
| MIT | 6 | 3 | 3 | 0 | .500 | 13 | 21 | 7 | 3 | 4 | 0 | 16 | 25 |
| New York State | – | – | – | – | – | – | – | – | – | – | – | – | – |
| Notre Dame | 3 | 2 | 1 | 0 | .667 | 7 | 9 | 3 | 2 | 1 | 0 | 7 | 9 |
| Pennsylvania | 8 | 3 | 4 | 1 | .438 | 17 | 37 | 9 | 3 | 5 | 1 | 18 | 44 |
| Princeton | 7 | 4 | 3 | 0 | .571 | 18 | 16 | 8 | 4 | 4 | 0 | 20 | 23 |
| Rensselaer | 4 | 1 | 3 | 0 | .250 | 7 | 13 | 4 | 1 | 3 | 0 | 7 | 13 |
| Tufts | – | – | – | – | – | – | – | – | – | – | – | – | – |
| Williams | 5 | 4 | 1 | 0 | .800 | 17 | 10 | 6 | 5 | 1 | 0 | 21 | 10 |
| Yale | 8 | 3 | 4 | 1 | .438 | 21 | 33 | 10 | 3 | 6 | 1 | 25 | 47 |
| YMCA College | 6 | 5 | 0 | 1 | .917 | 17 | 9 | 7 | 5 | 1 | 1 | 20 | 16 |

== Schedule and results ==
| Date | Opponent | Site | Result | Record |
Regular season
| January 15 | Hamilton* | Beebe Lake • Ithaca, New York | L 0–2 | 0–1–0 |
| January 21 | Buffalo* | Beebe Lake • Ithaca, New York | W 10–0 | 1–1–0 |
| February 11 | Colgate* | Beebe Lake • Ithaca, New York | W 2–0 | 2–1–0 |
| February 12 | at Pennsylvania* | Philadelphia Ice Palace • Philadelphia, Pennsylvania | L 3–4 ^{OT} | 2–2–0 |
| February 19 | at Columbia* | 181st Street Ice Palace • New York, New York | W 7–4 ^{†} | 3–2–0 |
*Non-conference game.

† Cornell records list this game as a 7–3 victory, however, contemporary reports from both Cornell and Columbia's newspapers report a 7–4 score.
