= 1920–21 Dartmouth Indians men's ice hockey season =

- Conference: Independent
- Home ice: Occom Pond

Record
- Overall: 6–4–1
- Home: 4–1–1
- Road: 1–3–0
- Neutral: 1–0–0

Coaches and captains
- Head coach: Leon Tuck
- Captain: Ryland Rothschild

The 1920–21 Dartmouth Indians men's ice hockey season was the 15th season of play for the program. The Indians were coached by Leon Tuck in his 1st season.

== Season ==
Fresh from winning a silver medal at the 1920 Summer Olympics, new head coach Leon Tuck took over a program looking to finally get over the hump. Though they were still forced to use a natural surface for their home rink, Dartmouth was able to gather a team together that looked primed for a championship early. The team won its first three games and then travelled south for its first big test of the year. Unfortunately, the Indians weren't as good on unfamiliar surfaces as they were at home and Dartmouth suffered a pair of embarrassing losses in Boston.

After being shutout in back-to-back games, the Indians returned home and paused for the exam break. When the season resumed in mid-February, the offense was still finding it difficult to score and Dartmouth extended their scoreless streak to three games. The main culprit in the Yale match was the extremely poor ice that caused the game to be called off just 3 minutes into the second period. No such excuse was available in the following game against MIT Engineers and Dartmouth posted a program-worst fourth consecutive game without a single goal to their credit. The Indians were finally able to get on the board against St. Paul's School but extended their winless streak to 5 games and, by all accounts, their season looked like it was spiraling into the abyss.

The games against Williams saw the team suddenly change its fortunes. Led by a hat-trick from defenseman J. Philip Bower, the Indians posted their first win in a month and a half. The offensive explosion carried over into the final two games of the year when Dartmouth headed down to Philadelphia for a 2-game stay at the Ice Palace. Dartmouth easily took down a pair of undermanned teams as both Penn and Princeton were missing several of their regulars. The final two games were played with 6-man units with Perry moving from rover to cover point.

== Roster ==
No.	Nat.	Player	Class	Pos	Height	Weight	DoB	Hometown	Previous team
	(United States)	Raymond P. Atwood	Junior	C			1900-03-27	Boston, Massachusetts
	(United States)	J. Philip Bower	Senior	D			1894-10-22	Richmond, Virginia
	(United States)	Charles A. Colder	Sophomore	R			1901-05-25	Cleveland, Ohio
	(United States)	John F. Dorney	Senior	D			1897-06-24	Newtonville, Massachusetts
	(United States)	John E. Foster	Sophomore	D			1900-06-28	Montclair, New Jersey
	(United States)	Edward R. Furey	Sophomore	RW			1897-05-10	New York, New York
	(United States)	Lloyd K. Neidlinger	Sophomore	G			1901-12-23	Brooklyn, New York
	(United States)	James M. Osborne	Sophomore	LW/RW			1901-05-09	Cleveland, Ohio
	(United States)	William H. Perry	Junior	D/R			1899-09-05	Somerville, Massachusetts
	(United States)	Frank A. Ross Jr.	Senior	LW/RW			1900-07-21	Allston, Massachusetts
	(United States)	Ryland J. Rothschild	Senior	C			1899-08-21	Saint Paul, Minnesota
	(United States)	Walter W. Sands	Junior	RW			1900-02-25	Cambridge, Massachusetts
	(United States)	Robert A. Smith	Sophomore	RW			1902-04-07	Arlington, Massachusetts

== Standings ==
1920–21 College ice hockey standings
	Intercollegiate							Overall					
	GP	W	L	T	Pct.	GF	GA	GP	W	L	T	GF	GA
Amherst	7	0	7	0	.000	8	19	7	0	7	0	8	19
Army	3	0	2	1	.167	6	11	3	0	2	1	6	11
Bates	4	2	2	0	.500	7	8	8	4	4	0	22	20
Boston College	7	6	1	0	.857	27	11	8	6	2	0	28	18
Bowdoin	4	0	3	1	.125	1	10	7	1	5	1	10	23
Buffalo	–	–	–	–	–	–	–	6	0	6	0	–	–
Carnegie Tech	5	0	4	1	.100	4	18	5	0	4	1	4	18
Clarkson	1	0	1	0	.000	1	6	3	2	1	0	12	14
Colgate	4	1	3	0	.250	8	14	5	2	3	0	9	14
Columbia	5	1	4	0	.200	21	24	5	1	4	0	21	24
Cornell	5	3	2	0	.600	22	10	5	3	2	0	22	10
Dartmouth	9	5	3	1	.611	24	21	11	6	4	1	30	27
Fordham	–	–	–	–	–	–	–	–	–	–	–	–	–
Hamilton	–	–	–	–	–	–	–	10	10	0	0	–	–
Harvard	6	6	0	0	1.000	42	3	10	8	2	0	55	8
Massachusetts Agricultural	7	3	4	0	.429	18	17	7	3	4	0	18	17
Michigan College of Mines	2	1	1	0	.500	9	5	10	6	4	0	29	21
MIT	6	3	3	0	.500	13	21	7	3	4	0	16	25
New York State	–	–	–	–	–	–	–	–	–	–	–	–	–
Notre Dame	3	2	1	0	.667	7	9	3	2	1	0	7	9
Pennsylvania	8	3	4	1	.438	17	37	9	3	5	1	18	44
Princeton	7	4	3	0	.571	18	16	8	4	4	0	20	23
Rensselaer	4	1	3	0	.250	7	13	4	1	3	0	7	13
Tufts	–	–	–	–	–	–	–	–	–	–	–	–	–
Williams	5	4	1	0	.800	17	10	6	5	1	0	21	10
Yale	8	3	4	1	.438	21	33	10	3	6	1	25	47
YMCA College	6	5	0	1	.917	17	9	7	5	1	1	20	16

== Schedule and results ==
Date	Opponent	Site	Result	Record
Regular Season
January 8	Amherst*	Occom Pond • Hanover, New Hampshire	W 4–2	1–0–0
January 11	King's*	Occom Pond • Hanover, New Hampshire	W 5–2	2–0–0
January 15	Massachusetts Agricultural*	Occom Pond • Hanover, New Hampshire	W 3–2	3–0–0
January 20	at Boston College*	Boston Arena • Boston, Massachusetts	L 0–4	3–1–0
January 22	at Harvard*	Boston Arena • Boston, Massachusetts	L 0–5	3–2–0
February 12	Yale*	Occom Pond • Hanover, New Hampshire	T 0–0	3–2–1
February 22	MIT*	Occom Pond • Hanover, New Hampshire	L 0–1	3–3–1
February 24	at St. Paul's School*	St. Paul's Rink • Concord, New Hampshire	L 1–4	3–4–1
February 26	Williams*	Occom Pond • Hanover, New Hampshire	W 6–4	4–4–1
March 4	at Pennsylvania*	Philadelphia Ice Palace • Philadelphia, Pennsylvania	W 7–2	5–4–1
March 5	vs. Princeton*	Philadelphia Ice Palace • Philadelphia, Pennsylvania	W 4–1	6–4–1
*Non-conference game.
