= 1920–21 RPI men's ice hockey season =

- Conference: Independent

Record
- Overall: 1–3–0
- Home: 1–2–0
- Road: 0–1–0

Coaches and captains
- Head coach: Leroy Clark
- Captain: William Tierney

The 1920–21 RPI men's ice hockey season was the 18th season of play for the program. The team was coached by Leroy Clark in his 4th season.

== Season ==
As was typical for the program, the Cherries played a scant number of games and didn't perform particularly well. RPI's offense was sorely lacking in most of their games and caused the team to be non competitive in three losses. The lone win for the team came against the worst team in college hockey, New York State, though even there Rensselaer didn't have very good news. Despite the win, RPI scored 17 fewer goals than they had the year before and only won due to the paucity of talent available to their opponents.

Note: Rensselaer's athletic teams were unofficially known as 'Cherry and White' until 1921 when the Engineers moniker debuted for the men's basketball team.

== Roster ==
| No. | Nat. | Player | Class | Pos | Height | Weight | DoB | Hometown | Previous team |
|---|---|---|---|---|---|---|---|---|---|
| | | William Tierney (C) |

== Standings ==
1920–21 College ice hockey standings
| | Intercollegiate | | | | | | | Overall | | | | | |
| | GP | W | L | T | Pct. | GF | GA | GP | W | L | T | GF | GA |
|---|---|---|---|---|---|---|---|---|---|---|---|---|---|
| Amherst | 7 | 0 | 7 | 0 | .000 | 8 | 19 | 7 | 0 | 7 | 0 | 8 | 19 |
| Army | 3 | 0 | 2 | 1 | .167 | 6 | 11 | 3 | 0 | 2 | 1 | 6 | 11 |
| Bates | 4 | 2 | 2 | 0 | .500 | 7 | 8 | 8 | 4 | 4 | 0 | 22 | 20 |
| Boston College | 7 | 6 | 1 | 0 | .857 | 27 | 11 | 8 | 6 | 2 | 0 | 28 | 18 |
| Bowdoin | 4 | 0 | 3 | 1 | .125 | 1 | 10 | 7 | 1 | 5 | 1 | 10 | 23 |
| Buffalo | – | – | – | – | – | – | – | 6 | 0 | 6 | 0 | – | – |
| Carnegie Tech | 5 | 0 | 4 | 1 | .100 | 4 | 18 | 5 | 0 | 4 | 1 | 4 | 18 |
| Clarkson | 1 | 0 | 1 | 0 | .000 | 1 | 6 | 3 | 2 | 1 | 0 | 12 | 14 |
| Colgate | 4 | 1 | 3 | 0 | .250 | 8 | 14 | 5 | 2 | 3 | 0 | 9 | 14 |
| Columbia | 5 | 1 | 4 | 0 | .200 | 21 | 24 | 5 | 1 | 4 | 0 | 21 | 24 |
| Cornell | 5 | 3 | 2 | 0 | .600 | 22 | 10 | 5 | 3 | 2 | 0 | 22 | 10 |
| Dartmouth | 9 | 5 | 3 | 1 | .611 | 24 | 21 | 11 | 6 | 4 | 1 | 30 | 27 |
| Fordham | – | – | – | – | – | – | – | – | – | – | – | – | – |
| Hamilton | – | – | – | – | – | – | – | 10 | 10 | 0 | 0 | – | – |
| Harvard | 6 | 6 | 0 | 0 | 1.000 | 42 | 3 | 10 | 8 | 2 | 0 | 55 | 8 |
| Massachusetts Agricultural | 7 | 3 | 4 | 0 | .429 | 18 | 17 | 7 | 3 | 4 | 0 | 18 | 17 |
| Michigan College of Mines | 2 | 1 | 1 | 0 | .500 | 9 | 5 | 10 | 6 | 4 | 0 | 29 | 21 |
| MIT | 6 | 3 | 3 | 0 | .500 | 13 | 21 | 7 | 3 | 4 | 0 | 16 | 25 |
| New York State | – | – | – | – | – | – | – | – | – | – | – | – | – |
| Notre Dame | 3 | 2 | 1 | 0 | .667 | 7 | 9 | 3 | 2 | 1 | 0 | 7 | 9 |
| Pennsylvania | 8 | 3 | 4 | 1 | .438 | 17 | 37 | 9 | 3 | 5 | 1 | 18 | 44 |
| Princeton | 7 | 4 | 3 | 0 | .571 | 18 | 16 | 8 | 4 | 4 | 0 | 20 | 23 |
| Rensselaer | 4 | 1 | 3 | 0 | .250 | 7 | 13 | 4 | 1 | 3 | 0 | 7 | 13 |
| Tufts | – | – | – | – | – | – | – | – | – | – | – | – | – |
| Williams | 5 | 4 | 1 | 0 | .800 | 17 | 10 | 6 | 5 | 1 | 0 | 21 | 10 |
| Yale | 8 | 3 | 4 | 1 | .438 | 21 | 33 | 10 | 3 | 6 | 1 | 25 | 47 |
| YMCA College | 6 | 5 | 0 | 1 | .917 | 17 | 9 | 7 | 5 | 1 | 1 | 20 | 16 |

== Schedule and results ==
| Date | Opponent | Site | Result | Record |
Regular Season
| January 15 | YMCA College* | RPI Rink • Troy, New York | L 1–3 | 0–1–0 |
| January 22 | Colgate* | RPI Rink • Troy, New York | L 0–5 | 0–2–0 |
| January 29 | New York State* | RPI Rink • Troy, New York | W 6–0 | 1–2–0 |
| February 12 | at Hamilton* | Clinton, New York | L 0–5 | 1–3–0 |
*Non-conference game.
