= 1920–21 Penn Quakers men's ice hockey season =

- Home ice: Philadelphia Ice Palace

Record
- Overall: 3–5–1
- Home: 2–4–0
- Road: 1–1–1

Coaches and captains
- Head coach: George Orton
- Captain: Andy Pringle

The 1920–21 Penn Quakers men's ice hockey season was the 9th season of play for the program.

== Season ==
With most programs having now returned from absences caused by World War I, Penn was hoping to form a new intercollegiate league with old rivals from the IHA. Harvard, the leading program at the time, elected to only keep its arrangement with Princeton and Yale. As a result, plans for the league were changed to allow Harvard to participate; instead of a conference, the league would operate in a more informal manner that would facilitate scheduling between teams as well as to certify rules that all members could accept. With those modifications, Penn was able to join the Intercollegiate Ice Hockey Association of America with five of its contemporaries, but membership was not the stabilizing force that Penn hoped it would be.

Penn had originally hoped to schedule a practice game before the winter break but no arrangement could be finalized. After Christmas the team was supposed to open the season on the 7th and 8 January, but both games were cancelled due to scheduling conflicts. In the end they were able to rope the St. Nicholas Hockey Club into a game on the 8th before playing their first intercollegiate game the following week.

In February Harvard finally accepted the inevitable and agreed to play 6-on-6 hockey beginning the following year. As a result the expectation was that the Intercollegiate league that had just been formed would become a fully-formed conference in the near future. The news came amidst a good streak for the Quakers with the team going 3–0–1 and looking like they would have a chance to earn a split with Princeton, but the Tigers, who were using the Philadelphia Ice Palace as their home rink, shut down the Penn offense and won the game 2–0.

== Roster ==
No.	Nat.	Player	Class	Pos	Height	Weight	DoB	Hometown	Previous team
		Cook		D
		DeKorn
		Diall		RW
		Fortier		RW
		Charles Jefferys		G
		Richard Kearns Jr.		F
		Murray		F/D
		O'Reilly		D
		Andrew C. Pringle (C)	Sophomore	C
		C. Smith		D

== Standings ==
1920–21 College ice hockey standings
	Intercollegiate							Overall					
	GP	W	L	T	Pct.	GF	GA	GP	W	L	T	GF	GA
Amherst	7	0	7	0	.000	8	19	7	0	7	0	8	19
Army	3	0	2	1	.167	6	11	3	0	2	1	6	11
Bates	4	2	2	0	.500	7	8	8	4	4	0	22	20
Boston College	7	6	1	0	.857	27	11	8	6	2	0	28	18
Bowdoin	4	0	3	1	.125	1	10	7	1	5	1	10	23
Buffalo	–	–	–	–	–	–	–	6	0	6	0	–	–
Carnegie Tech	5	0	4	1	.100	4	18	5	0	4	1	4	18
Clarkson	1	0	1	0	.000	1	6	3	2	1	0	12	14
Colgate	4	1	3	0	.250	8	14	5	2	3	0	9	14
Columbia	5	1	4	0	.200	21	24	5	1	4	0	21	24
Cornell	5	3	2	0	.600	22	10	5	3	2	0	22	10
Dartmouth	9	5	3	1	.611	24	21	11	6	4	1	30	27
Fordham	–	–	–	–	–	–	–	–	–	–	–	–	–
Hamilton	–	–	–	–	–	–	–	10	10	0	0	–	–
Harvard	6	6	0	0	1.000	42	3	10	8	2	0	55	8
Massachusetts Agricultural	7	3	4	0	.429	18	17	7	3	4	0	18	17
Michigan College of Mines	2	1	1	0	.500	9	5	10	6	4	0	29	21
MIT	6	3	3	0	.500	13	21	7	3	4	0	16	25
New York State	–	–	–	–	–	–	–	–	–	–	–	–	–
Notre Dame	3	2	1	0	.667	7	9	3	2	1	0	7	9
Pennsylvania	8	3	4	1	.438	17	37	9	3	5	1	18	44
Princeton	7	4	3	0	.571	18	16	8	4	4	0	20	23
Rensselaer	4	1	3	0	.250	7	13	4	1	3	0	7	13
Tufts	–	–	–	–	–	–	–	–	–	–	–	–	–
Williams	5	4	1	0	.800	17	10	6	5	1	0	21	10
Yale	8	3	4	1	.438	21	33	10	3	6	1	25	47
YMCA College	6	5	0	1	.917	17	9	7	5	1	1	20	16

== Schedule and results ==
Date	Opponent	Site	Result	Record
Regular Season
January 8	St. Nicholas Hockey Club*	Philadelphia Ice Palace • Philadelphia, Pennsylvania	L 1–7	0–1–0
January 14	Princeton*	Philadelphia Ice Palace • Philadelphia, Pennsylvania	L 1–6	0–2–0
January 22	at Fordham*	181st Street Ice Palace • Manhattan, New York	L 3–15	0–3–0
January 28	at Carnegie Tech*	Duquesne Garden • Pittsburgh, Pennsylvania	T 3–3 ^{2OT}	0–3–1
February 2	Columbia*	Philadelphia Ice Palace • Philadelphia, Pennsylvania	W 2–0	1–3–1
February 12	Cornell*	Philadelphia Ice Palace • Philadelphia, Pennsylvania	W 4–3 ^{OT}	2–3–1
February 21	at Carnegie Tech*	Duquesne Garden • Pittsburgh, Pennsylvania	W 2–1 ^{OT}	3–3–1
February 25	Princeton*	Philadelphia Ice Palace • Philadelphia, Pennsylvania	L 0–2	3–4–1
March 4	Dartmouth*	Philadelphia Ice Palace • Philadelphia, Pennsylvania	L 2–7	3–5–1
*Non-conference game.
