= 1920–21 Colgate men's ice hockey season =

- Conference: Independent
- Home ice: Taylor Lake

Record
- Overall: 2–3–0
- Home: 0–1–0
- Road: 2–2–0

Coaches and captains
- Head coach: James Ballantine
- Captain: Chester Sanford

The 1920–21 Colgate men's ice hockey season was the 3rd season of play for the program. The team was coached by James Ballantine in his 1st season.

== Season ==
In early December, the athletic department announced that ice hockey would once more be supported as a varsity program. Colonel James Ballatine, who introduced lacrosse to Colgate the previous summer, agreed to be the first head coach in the history of the program. A schedule of 5 games was hastily arranged with Hamilton and Rensselaer each appearing twice. Due to the late nature of the announcement, the schedule was rearranged several times before any games were played.

The team used Taylor Lake for its home ice and practices, however, due to a warm winter they weren't able to get much training in before their first game. While RPI was scheduled to be their first opponent for the squad, they managed to shoehorn in a game with the Albany Country Club to try and get a bit of experience ahead of their intercollegiate schedule. The match was played on rough ice that slowed both teams down but did allow Colgate to put forth a solid defensive effort. The only goal was scored by Sanford after intercepting a pass and the Reds were able to get their first win in about 4 years. The extra workout seemed to be just what the team needed as they were able to roll over Rensselaer the following day. This time on good ice, the team was able to show its speed and outplayed the Engineers in both halves. The game is also noteworthy for being the first 6-on-6 game in program history.

The team sat on the sidelines until after the exam break and returned with an exhibition match with Hamilton. The Continentals were one of the best teams in college hockey that year and showed as much by shutting down the Colgate offense. The Reds, however, performed better than expected by limiting the visitors to a single goal and showed that they weren't to be taken lightly. An official game between the two took place a few days later but ended up with the same score. Shortly afterwards the academic results were announced. The team was stung by the loss of Sanford, Hurley and Pearsall who were now lost until they could regain their eligibility. The now-handicapped team travelled to face Cornell and play on a surface nearly double the size of the one they had at home. The completely remade offensive contingent was unable to score in the game, wasting a solid defensive effort due to a lack of familiarity.

Colgate had a few weeks before the final game of the season and that enabled Pearsall and Sanford to resolve their issues. Both were back in their regular positions for the final match but the team was completely swamped by Columbia. While Sanford was able to collect a hat-trick in the match the defense collapsed and surrendered 11 goals to the Lions. To add insult to injury, it was the first win for Columbia on the season and left the Reds with a losing record.

George E. Anderson served as team manager with Warner Chadwick as his assistant.

Note: Colgate's athletic teams did not have a moniker until 'Red Raiders' was adopted in 1932.

== Roster ==
No.	Nat.	Player	Class	Pos	Height	Weight	DoB	Hometown	Previous team
	(United States)	William S. Childs	Sophomore	RW				Bernardsville, New Jersey
	(United States)	William F. Farnham	Junior	D			1898-01-08	New Haven, Connecticut
	(United States)	George C. Gormly	Junior	G				Cleveland, Ohio
	(United States)	Robert P. Gygli	Junior	C			1900-01-13	Cleveland, Ohio
	(United States)	Morgan S. Hurley	Freshman	RW				Buffalo, New York
	(United States)	Ralph W. Pearsall	Sophomore	LW			1901-06-02	Sea Cliff, New York
	(United States)	Chester W. Sanford (C)	Freshman	R/C				Medford, Massachusetts
	(United States)	Edward L. Townsend	Sophomore	D				Flushing, New York
	(United States)	Fred S. Wood	Sophomore	LW				Mount Kisco, New York

== Standings ==
1920–21 College ice hockey standings
	Intercollegiate							Overall					
	GP	W	L	T	Pct.	GF	GA	GP	W	L	T	GF	GA
Amherst	7	0	7	0	.000	8	19	7	0	7	0	8	19
Army	3	0	2	1	.167	6	11	3	0	2	1	6	11
Bates	4	2	2	0	.500	7	8	8	4	4	0	22	20
Boston College	7	6	1	0	.857	27	11	8	6	2	0	28	18
Bowdoin	4	0	3	1	.125	1	10	7	1	5	1	10	23
Buffalo	–	–	–	–	–	–	–	6	0	6	0	–	–
Carnegie Tech	5	0	4	1	.100	4	18	5	0	4	1	4	18
Clarkson	1	0	1	0	.000	1	6	3	2	1	0	12	14
Colgate	4	1	3	0	.250	8	14	5	2	3	0	9	14
Columbia	5	1	4	0	.200	21	24	5	1	4	0	21	24
Cornell	5	3	2	0	.600	22	10	5	3	2	0	22	10
Dartmouth	9	5	3	1	.611	24	21	11	6	4	1	30	27
Fordham	–	–	–	–	–	–	–	–	–	–	–	–	–
Hamilton	–	–	–	–	–	–	–	10	10	0	0	–	–
Harvard	6	6	0	0	1.000	42	3	10	8	2	0	55	8
Massachusetts Agricultural	7	3	4	0	.429	18	17	7	3	4	0	18	17
Michigan College of Mines	2	1	1	0	.500	9	5	10	6	4	0	29	21
MIT	6	3	3	0	.500	13	21	7	3	4	0	16	25
New York State	–	–	–	–	–	–	–	–	–	–	–	–	–
Notre Dame	3	2	1	0	.667	7	9	3	2	1	0	7	9
Pennsylvania	8	3	4	1	.438	17	37	9	3	5	1	18	44
Princeton	7	4	3	0	.571	18	16	8	4	4	0	20	23
Rensselaer	4	1	3	0	.250	7	13	4	1	3	0	7	13
Tufts	–	–	–	–	–	–	–	–	–	–	–	–	–
Williams	5	4	1	0	.800	17	10	6	5	1	0	21	10
Yale	8	3	4	1	.438	21	33	10	3	6	1	25	47
YMCA College	6	5	0	1	.917	17	9	7	5	1	1	20	16

== Schedule and results ==
Date	Opponent	Site	Result	Record
Regular Season
January 21	at Albany Country Club*	Albany, New York	W 1–0	1–0–0
January 22	at Rensselaer*	RPI Rink • Troy, New York	W 5–0	2–0–0
February 5	Hamilton*	Taylor Lake • Hamilton, New York (Exhibition)	L 0–1	
February 9	Hamilton*	Taylor Lake • Hamilton, New York	L 0–1	2–1–0
February 11	at Cornell*	Beebe Lake • Ithaca, New York	L 0–2	2–2–0
February 26	at Columbia*	181st Street Ice Palace • New York, New York	L 3–11	2–3–0
*Non-conference game.

== Scoring statistics ==
Name	Position	Games	Goals
Chester Sanford	R/C	-	6
Edward Townsend	P	-	2
Morgan Hurley	RW	-	1
William Childs	RW	-	0
William Farnham	CP	-	0
George Gormley	G	-	0
Robert Gygli	C	-	0
Ralph Pearsall	LW	-	0
Fred Wood	LW	-	0
Total			9
