= 1920–21 Bates men's ice hockey season =

Intercollegiate hockey season

- Conference: Independent
- Home ice: Lake Andrews

Record
- Overall: 4–4–0
- Home: 1–3–0
- Road: 2–1–0
- Neutral: 1–0–0

Coaches and captains
- Head coach: Carl H. Smith
- Captain(s): Felix Cutler (first 6 games); Carleton Wiggin (final 2 games)

The 1920–21 Bates men's ice hockey season was the 2nd season of play for the program.

== Season ==
As the season was just getting underway, Bates decided to promote the year-old program to 'major' status. As did many college teams at the time, Bates was in the process of switching from a 7-player team to a 6-player team as the position of rover was being abolished, though they did play with the extra man during the season. Bates' first game came against Boston College and the team looked lost against the Bostonian outfit. Bates was whipped 0–5 by their more experienced and better supplied opponents but didn't let the loss scuttle their season. The next week, after addressing some of their issues, the team looked much better against an amateur outfit from Berlin. The defense showed up well and didn't allow a single goal to the men from New Hampshire. The only problem what that Bates couldn't score either. Even after 2 overtime periods the scoresheet remained empty. Captain Cutler won a coin toss and decided to extend the game by two additional 10-minute periods and the gamble paid off. Cutler scored the only goal of the match in the third extra period and the defense held for the remainder of time to give the program its first ever win. Two days later, Cutler scored a pair of goal en route to the team's second win and first over local rival Bowdoin.

Bates continued to roll with a 10–0 win over the St. Dominique team from Lewiston. Many substitutions were used in the game and allowed the regulars to play out of place. Wiggin, the regular goaltender for Bates, got a spell at wing and managed to score one of the team's goals. Bates suffered a setback in their next game and got swamped by the Portland Country Club and then lost the rematch with Berlin in overtime. Despite losing Cutler to graduation for the final Bowdoin series, Bates was able to defeat the Bears once more. In the final game of the season, Bates played under the old rules with two 20-minute periods but still made it a close game. The team had trouble scoring and had to rely on acting captain Wiggin in goal. While they ultimately lost the game, Bates was still lauded for putting up a solid performance.

Leroy Gross served as team manager.

Note: Bates did not adopt the 'Bobcats' moniker until 1924.

== Roster ==
No.	Nat.	Player	Class	Pos	Height	Weight	DoB	Hometown	Previous team
	(United States)	Raymond J. Batten	Sophomore	G			1901-03-09	Wakefield, Massachusetts
	(United States)	Carl W. Belmore	Senior	D/RW			1899-05-07	Wakefield, Massachusetts
	(United States)	Joseph W. Cogan	Freshman	C			1902-01-01	Stoneham, Massachusetts
	(United States)	Felix V. Cutler (C)	Senior	D/R			1894-02-24	Brookline, Massachusetts
		Delaney	Freshman	D/RW
	(United States)	Edward F. Roberts	Sophomore	LW/RW			1901-10-14	Presque Isle, Maine
	(United States)	Carl P. Rounds	Junior	D			1898-01-01	Minot, Maine
	(United States)	Arthur B. Scott	Sophomore	D			1900-02-26	South Boston, Massachusetts
	(United States)	Otho F. Smith	Senior	LW/RW			1987-02-27	Franklin, Maine
	(United States)	Richard J. Stanley	Freshman	D/R			1902-08-20	Lewiston, Maine
	(United States)	Carleton L. Wiggin (C)	Senior	G/F			1897-07-29	Dover, New Hampshire

== Standings ==
1920–21 College ice hockey standings
	Intercollegiate							Overall					
	GP	W	L	T	Pct.	GF	GA	GP	W	L	T	GF	GA
Amherst	7	0	7	0	.000	8	19	7	0	7	0	8	19
Army	3	0	2	1	.167	6	11	3	0	2	1	6	11
Bates	4	2	2	0	.500	7	8	8	4	4	0	22	20
Boston College	7	6	1	0	.857	27	11	8	6	2	0	28	18
Bowdoin	4	0	3	1	.125	1	10	7	1	5	1	10	23
Buffalo	–	–	–	–	–	–	–	6	0	6	0	–	–
Carnegie Tech	5	0	4	1	.100	4	18	5	0	4	1	4	18
Clarkson	1	0	1	0	.000	1	6	3	2	1	0	12	14
Colgate	4	1	3	0	.250	8	14	5	2	3	0	9	14
Columbia	5	1	4	0	.200	21	24	5	1	4	0	21	24
Cornell	5	3	2	0	.600	22	10	5	3	2	0	22	10
Dartmouth	9	5	3	1	.611	24	21	11	6	4	1	30	27
Fordham	–	–	–	–	–	–	–	–	–	–	–	–	–
Hamilton	–	–	–	–	–	–	–	10	10	0	0	–	–
Harvard	6	6	0	0	1.000	42	3	10	8	2	0	55	8
Massachusetts Agricultural	7	3	4	0	.429	18	17	7	3	4	0	18	17
Michigan College of Mines	2	1	1	0	.500	9	5	10	6	4	0	29	21
MIT	6	3	3	0	.500	13	21	7	3	4	0	16	25
New York State	–	–	–	–	–	–	–	–	–	–	–	–	–
Notre Dame	3	2	1	0	.667	7	9	3	2	1	0	7	9
Pennsylvania	8	3	4	1	.438	17	37	9	3	5	1	18	44
Princeton	7	4	3	0	.571	18	16	8	4	4	0	20	23
Rensselaer	4	1	3	0	.250	7	13	4	1	3	0	7	13
Tufts	–	–	–	–	–	–	–	–	–	–	–	–	–
Williams	5	4	1	0	.800	17	10	6	5	1	0	21	10
Yale	8	3	4	1	.438	21	33	10	3	6	1	25	47
YMCA College	6	5	0	1	.917	17	9	7	5	1	1	20	16

== Schedule and results ==
Date	Opponent	Site	Result	Record
Regular Season
January 8	Boston College*	Lake Andrews Rink • Lewiston, Maine	L 0–5	0–1–0
January 20	at Berlin*	Berlin, New Hampshire	W 1–0 ^{4OT}	1–1–0
January 22	at Bowdoin*	Delta Rink • Brunswick, Maine	W 4–0	2–1–0
January 26	vs. St. Dominique*	Lake Andrews Rink • Lewiston, Maine	W 10–0	3–1–0
January 29	at Portland Country Club*	Portland, Maine	L 3–10	3–2–0
February 4	Berlin*	Lake Andrews Rink • Lewiston, Maine	L 1–2 ^{OT}	3–3–0
February 22	Bowdoin*	Lake Andrews Rink • Lewiston, Maine	W 2–1	4–3–0
February 25	YMCA College*	Lake Andrews Rink • Lewiston, Maine	L 1–2	4–4–0
*Non-conference game.
