= 1920–21 Army Cadets men's ice hockey season =

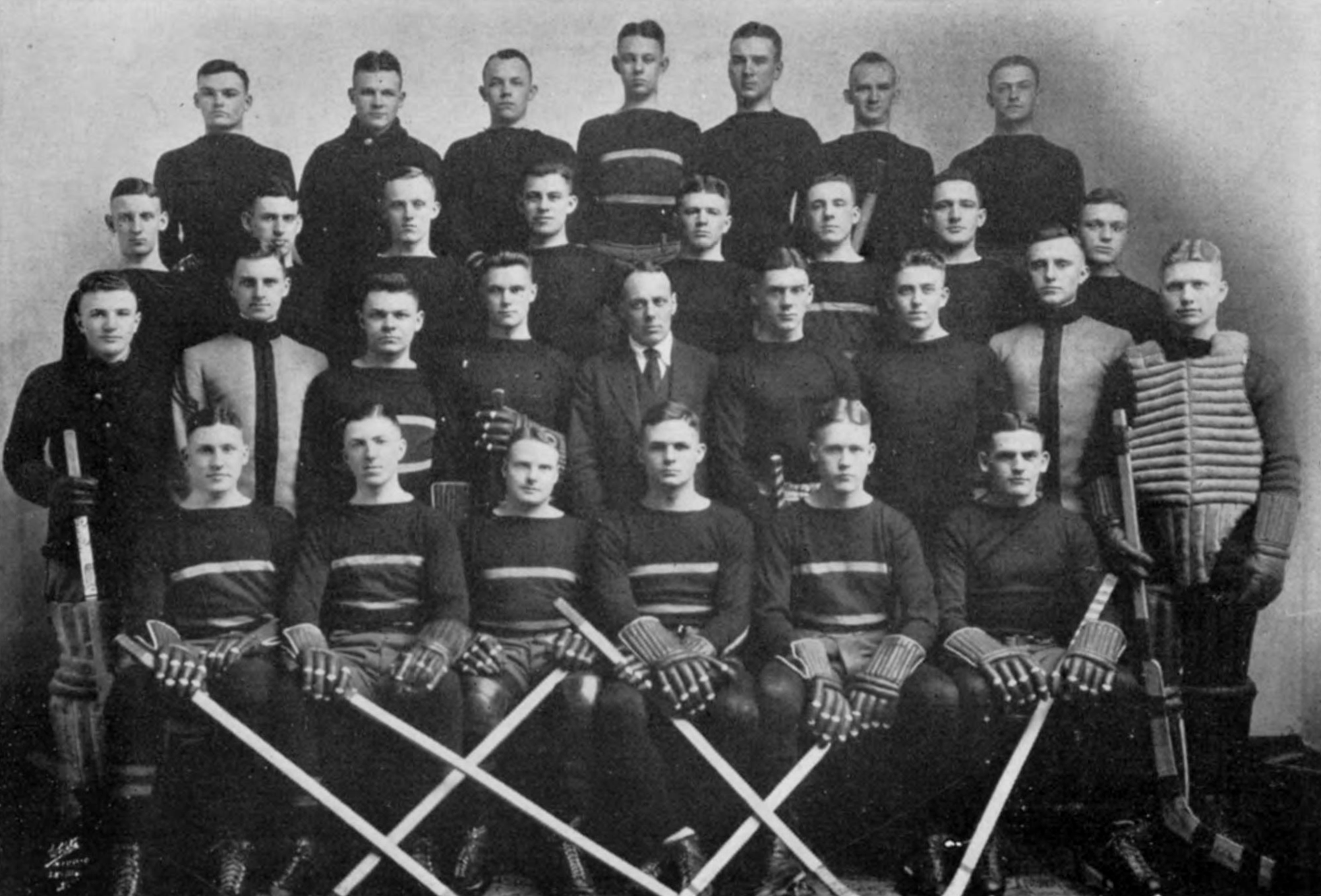
- Conference: Independent
- Home ice: Stuart Rink

Record
- Overall: 0–2–1
- Home: 0–2–1

Coaches and captains
- Head coach: Talbot Hunter
- Captain: Harry Stout

The 1920–21 Army Cadets men's ice hockey season was the 18th season of play for the program. The team was coached by Talbot Hunter in his 1st season.

== Season ==
There were high hopes for the team when it brought in Talbot Hunter. This was the first time that the team had used someone who was a professional coach and Hunter had years of experience at the college level. Unfortunately, warm weather wrecked the Cadet's season. The team was not even assembled until after the new year but 30 men showed up despite the difficulties. Owing to the poor ice, only four games were scheduled, but even then, the first against Pennsylvania had to be cancelled. The first match ended up being with YMCA College in early February. The teams fought to a 1–1 draw after two halves and then exploded offensively in overtime. Both sides netted 2 goals and finished with a tie.

Army lost their starting center, Woods, to a broken ankle and O'Shea was put in his place for the final two games. He played well in relief and helped the Cadets perform well in two losses. Despite the record, Army showed improvement under Hunter and the belief was all that was needed for the team to take the next step was suitable weather.

== Roster ==
No.	Nat.	Player	Class	Pos	Height	Weight	DoB	Hometown	Previous team
	(United States)	William B. Goddard	Junior	RW				Flushing, New York
	(United States)	Melville F. Grant	Junior	LW			1900-01-25	Medford, Massachusetts
	(United States)	Alfred E. Kastner	Junior	G			1900-12-14	Chambersburg, Pennsylvania
	(United States)	Walter C. Marinelli	Freshman	R				Calumet, Michigan
	(United States)	Paul D. Michelet	Sophomore	RW			1900-04-18	Minneapolis, Minnesota
	(United States)	James D. O'Connell	Junior				1899-09-25	Chicago, Illinois
	(United States)	Kevin O'Shea	Sophomore	C				New York, New York
	(United States)	Harry H. Stout Jr. (C)	Junior				1900-12-27	Santa Cruz, California
	(United States)	Hoyt S. Vandenberg	Sophomore	LW			1899-01-24	Milwaukee, Wisconsin
	(United States)	Henry J. Woodbury	Junior	R				Auburn, Maine
	(United States)	Fred J. Woods	Junior	C			1898-03-19	Seneca Falls, New York

== Standings ==
1920–21 College ice hockey standings
	Intercollegiate							Overall					
	GP	W	L	T	Pct.	GF	GA	GP	W	L	T	GF	GA
Amherst	7	0	7	0	.000	8	19	7	0	7	0	8	19
Army	3	0	2	1	.167	6	11	3	0	2	1	6	11
Bates	4	2	2	0	.500	7	8	8	4	4	0	22	20
Boston College	7	6	1	0	.857	27	11	8	6	2	0	28	18
Bowdoin	4	0	3	1	.125	1	10	7	1	5	1	10	23
Buffalo	–	–	–	–	–	–	–	6	0	6	0	–	–
Carnegie Tech	5	0	4	1	.100	4	18	5	0	4	1	4	18
Clarkson	1	0	1	0	.000	1	6	3	2	1	0	12	14
Colgate	4	1	3	0	.250	8	14	5	2	3	0	9	14
Columbia	5	1	4	0	.200	21	24	5	1	4	0	21	24
Cornell	5	3	2	0	.600	22	10	5	3	2	0	22	10
Dartmouth	9	5	3	1	.611	24	21	11	6	4	1	30	27
Fordham	–	–	–	–	–	–	–	–	–	–	–	–	–
Hamilton	–	–	–	–	–	–	–	10	10	0	0	–	–
Harvard	6	6	0	0	1.000	42	3	10	8	2	0	55	8
Massachusetts Agricultural	7	3	4	0	.429	18	17	7	3	4	0	18	17
Michigan College of Mines	2	1	1	0	.500	9	5	10	6	4	0	29	21
MIT	6	3	3	0	.500	13	21	7	3	4	0	16	25
New York State	–	–	–	–	–	–	–	–	–	–	–	–	–
Notre Dame	3	2	1	0	.667	7	9	3	2	1	0	7	9
Pennsylvania	8	3	4	1	.438	17	37	9	3	5	1	18	44
Princeton	7	4	3	0	.571	18	16	8	4	4	0	20	23
Rensselaer	4	1	3	0	.250	7	13	4	1	3	0	7	13
Tufts	–	–	–	–	–	–	–	–	–	–	–	–	–
Williams	5	4	1	0	.800	17	10	6	5	1	0	21	10
Yale	8	3	4	1	.438	21	33	10	3	6	1	25	47
YMCA College	6	5	0	1	.917	17	9	7	5	1	1	20	16

== Schedule and results ==
Date	Opponent	Site	Result	Record
Regular Season
January 29	YMCA College*	Stuart Rink • West Point, New York	T 3–3 ^{OT}	0–0–1
February 4	Williams*	Stuart Rink • West Point, New York	L 2–3	0–1–1
February 26	Hamilton*	Stuart Rink • West Point, New York	L 1–5	0–2–1
*Non-conference game.
