= 1920–21 Clarkson Golden Knights men's ice hockey season =

Intercollegiate hockey season

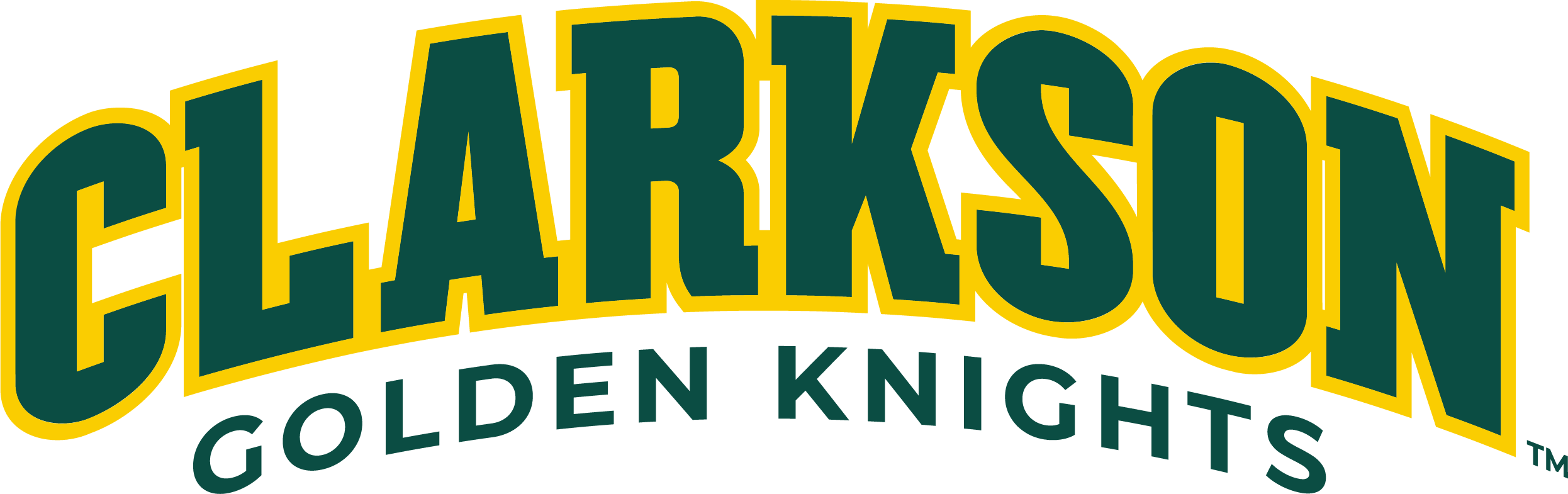
- Home ice: Ives Park

Record
- Overall: 2–1–0
- Home: 1–0–0
- Road: 1–1–0

Coaches and captains
- Captain: Bill Johnson

The 1920–21 Clarkson Golden Knights men's ice hockey season was the inaugural season of play for the program.

== Season ==
With colleges in the United States now back in full swing after the end of World War I, the Thomas S. Clarkson Memorial College of Technology, or Clarkson for short, joined a growing list of schools who added ice hockey as a varsity sport. Students at Clarkson had organized a team before the war but it was not officially recognized by the school. Their continued efforts, however, led the college to sign off on the 'minor' program for the 20–21 scholastic year. Gordon Croskery is listed by Clarkson as being the team's head coach this season, however, according to their records, Croskery was still attending MIT and wouldn't graduate until the spring of 1922. For their ice rink, the team was forced to wait for the weather to grow cold enough to freeze the water in and around Ives Park, a wooded area on the shore of Norwood Lake. This would serve as the team's home for the first 18 years of its existence.

On the ice, sophomore Bill Johnson was the team's captain and, by all accounts, its best player. In the program's first game, they played an amateur club from Alexandria Bay. Johnson scored all 6 of the Knights' goals in their 6–4 win. Four days later the team was in Clinton for its first intercollegiate match, facing off against Hamilton College. Their second game didn't go nearly as smoothly and Clarkson lost 1–6. Their final game of the season served as not only the team's first ever home game but also as a rematch with Alexandria Bay. The two produced a near replica of the first match with Clarkson winning 5–4.

While its first season lasted just over a week, the team could take pride in being able to produce a winning record, albeit against relatively weak competition.

== Roster ==
No.	Nat.	Player	Class	Pos	Height	Weight	DoB	Hometown	Previous team
		Richard Conboy	Sophomore	G
		Dillion	Sophomore
	(United States)	Cyril Fenn	Freshman	D				New York, New York
		Bill Johnson (C)	Sophomore	F
		Russel Sanford	Freshman
		Leland Stevens	Sophomore

== Standings ==
1920–21 College ice hockey standings
	Intercollegiate							Overall					
	GP	W	L	T	Pct.	GF	GA	GP	W	L	T	GF	GA
Amherst	7	0	7	0	.000	8	19	7	0	7	0	8	19
Army	3	0	2	1	.167	6	11	3	0	2	1	6	11
Bates	4	2	2	0	.500	7	8	8	4	4	0	22	20
Boston College	7	6	1	0	.857	27	11	8	6	2	0	28	18
Bowdoin	4	0	3	1	.125	1	10	7	1	5	1	10	23
Buffalo	–	–	–	–	–	–	–	6	0	6	0	–	–
Carnegie Tech	5	0	4	1	.100	4	18	5	0	4	1	4	18
Clarkson	1	0	1	0	.000	1	6	3	2	1	0	12	14
Colgate	4	1	3	0	.250	8	14	5	2	3	0	9	14
Columbia	5	1	4	0	.200	21	24	5	1	4	0	21	24
Cornell	5	3	2	0	.600	22	10	5	3	2	0	22	10
Dartmouth	9	5	3	1	.611	24	21	11	6	4	1	30	27
Fordham	–	–	–	–	–	–	–	–	–	–	–	–	–
Hamilton	–	–	–	–	–	–	–	10	10	0	0	–	–
Harvard	6	6	0	0	1.000	42	3	10	8	2	0	55	8
Massachusetts Agricultural	7	3	4	0	.429	18	17	7	3	4	0	18	17
Michigan College of Mines	2	1	1	0	.500	9	5	10	6	4	0	29	21
MIT	6	3	3	0	.500	13	21	7	3	4	0	16	25
New York State	–	–	–	–	–	–	–	–	–	–	–	–	–
Notre Dame	3	2	1	0	.667	7	9	3	2	1	0	7	9
Pennsylvania	8	3	4	1	.438	17	37	9	3	5	1	18	44
Princeton	7	4	3	0	.571	18	16	8	4	4	0	20	23
Rensselaer	4	1	3	0	.250	7	13	4	1	3	0	7	13
Tufts	–	–	–	–	–	–	–	–	–	–	–	–	–
Williams	5	4	1	0	.800	17	10	6	5	1	0	21	10
Yale	8	3	4	1	.438	21	33	10	3	6	1	25	47
YMCA College	6	5	0	1	.917	17	9	7	5	1	1	20	16

== Schedule and results ==
Date	Opponent	Site	Result	Record
Regular season
February 12	at Alexandria Bay*	Alexandria Bay, New York	W 6–4	1–0–0
February 16	at Hamilton*	Clinton, New York	L 1–6	1–1–0
February 19	vs. Alexandria Bay*	Ives Park • Potsdam, New York	W 5–4	2–1–0
*Non-conference game.
