= 1920–21 Boston College Eagles men's ice hockey season =

- Conference: Independent
- Home ice: Boston Arena; Alumni Field Rink

Record
- Overall: 6–2–0
- Home: 3–0–0
- Road: 1–0–0
- Neutral: 2–2–0

Coaches and captains
- Head coach: Fred Rocque
- Captain: Leo Hughes

The 1920–21 Boston College Eagles men's ice hockey season was the 4th season of play for the program. The Eagles were coached by Fred Rocque in his 1st season.

== Season ==
Boston College received good news before the start of the season with the reconstruction of the Boston Arena continuing apace. Because it would not be quite ready for the start of the season, the university decided to build two temporary rinks on the football field and use those in the interim. Early on, team captain Leo Hughes acted as the team's coach while the Eagles awaited the hiring of a new bench boss. Several men were in the running, including last year's head coach Walter Falvey, however, the school eventually settled on the more experienced Fred Rocque. A big benefit to Rocque was that virtually the same team that had finished with an excellent record was returning. Garrity, Healey and Hughes were back as a threesome on the forward line while the Morrissey brothers were arranged on defense. McCloskey, Ed O'Brien and Urban were all available in goal while Curry would serve as the primary reserve.

For the first game, BC headed up to Maine to take on Bates. Because the Garnet still played 7-man hockey, Currey got to start the game at center while Hughes occupied the spot at rover. The change didn't seem to adversely affect the club since it was the Eagles who dominated the game from start to finish. Curry and Healey each scored a pair while Hughes picked up the other marker. The following week, Boston College was back to 6-man play when they took on MIT and appeared a bit slow at the start. Tech scored three goals in the first half of the game with only a single marker from Hughes for the Eagles. Momentum swung to BC in the second half, however, and the Eagles were able to score three goals in the final period and a half. Hughes finished the comeback with just minutes left in regulation to take the match.

While the Eagles had attempted to schedule a Canadian college, no match was able to be played. Instead, the team took on one of Rocque's old clubs, Dartmouth. The Indians were undefeated entering the match and were expected to vie for the intercollegiate title, however, the Eagles were unimpressed by the Greens and sent them packing with a stunning shutout victory. Urban was solid in his first appearance of the season but the balance of play was carried by the BC skaters. The offense hemmed Dartmouth in their own end for much of the match while the defense limited the Greens to just 6 shots on goal. A second 2-goal game from Hughes led the way with some on the BC side calling him the next Hobey Baker.

BC followed it hot start with a busy week to end January. The team was set to play 3 games in 6 days and kicked things off with a rematch against MIT. With both Urban and O'Brien unavailable, coach Rocque turned to McCluskey and the cold netminder played as best he could. Unfortunately, on the other end of the ice, the Engineer goaltender put up a stellar performance while facing nearly 50 shots. The BC offense was able to get 3 goals on the night but that was matched by Tech and overtime was needed to settle the game. In spite of the barrage from the forward unit, MIT's defense held and a fourth goal from the Engineers couldn't be answered before the final buzzer. Still smarting from the loss, the team returned to campus for the next game. With the Boston Arena being used, the Eagles staged a match with Amherst on Alumni Field. Rocque decided to insert Dan Murphy, a freshman, into the goal. Murphy had a little trouble getting to his game in the first part of the game and allowed two goals to the underpowered Lord Jeffs. By the second half, however, Murphy had grown accustomed to the college game and turned aside all further shots to help the Eagles get back into the win column. The team wrapped up the busy period with a return to the Arena and a meeting with Massachusetts Agricultural. Hughes was nursing a knee injury throughout the match and wasn't able to play his normal fast game, however, he was able to hang back and provide an extra layer of defense for the club. Frank Morrissey chipped in on offense in his stead and helped the team eke out a 2–1 win to end the month on a high note.

Urban was back for the game against the Shoe Trades but the team was dealt a severe blow when Hughes was injured. The team's star player remained in the game but was a shadow of his former self and could hardly skate with a badly bruised knee and thigh. The lack of speed from the Eagles only helped the Traders but the biggest problem was Urban's inexperience with plays from behind the net. The BC goalie was time and again beaten when one of the opponents skated around the back of the cage and whipped the puck into the net. More than half of the Shoe Trades goals were scored in this manner, however, even without those markers the hamstrung Eagles would still have fallen to the Traders.

The team had long layoff afterwards and didn't play another game for more than 3 weeks. Even with the extended rest, Hughes was unable to play in the final game. The BC forwards played a tremendous game in his absence with Healey netting a hat-trick while Garrity potted two more. Curry played at center for the entire game and was superb on both ends of the ice, simultaneously breaking up MIT rushes and assisting on seemingly every Eagle goal.

Henry McInerney served as team manager.

== Roster ==
No.	Nat.	Player	Class	Pos	Height	Weight	DoB	Hometown	Previous team
	(United States)	John R. Curry	Sophomore	C				Cambridge, Massachusetts
	(United States)	T. Edmund Garrity	Sophomore	LW				Belmont, Massachusetts
	(United States)	Bernard Healy		RW				Brookline, Massachusetts
	(United States)	S. Leo Hughes (C)	Junior	R/C				Newton, Massachusetts
	(United States)	Donald T. McCluskey	Sophomore	G				Dorchester, Massachusetts
	(United States)	Francis J. Morrissey	Senior	D				Medford, Massachusetts
	(United States)	Leonard G. Morrissey	Sophomore	D			1899-03-11	Medford, Massachusetts
	(United States)	Daniel J. Murphy	Freshman	G				Arlington, Massachusetts
	(United States)	Edmund G. O'Brien	Junior	G				Cambridge, Massachusetts
	(United States)	Nelson J. O'Brien	Junior	LW				Cambridge, Massachusetts
	(United States)	Louis J. Urban	Senior	G			1898-03-22	Fall River, Massachusetts

== Standings ==
1920–21 College ice hockey standings
	Intercollegiate							Overall					
	GP	W	L	T	Pct.	GF	GA	GP	W	L	T	GF	GA
Amherst	7	0	7	0	.000	8	19	7	0	7	0	8	19
Army	3	0	2	1	.167	6	11	3	0	2	1	6	11
Bates	4	2	2	0	.500	7	8	8	4	4	0	22	20
Boston College	7	6	1	0	.857	27	11	8	6	2	0	28	18
Bowdoin	4	0	3	1	.125	1	10	7	1	5	1	10	23
Buffalo	–	–	–	–	–	–	–	6	0	6	0	–	–
Carnegie Tech	5	0	4	1	.100	4	18	5	0	4	1	4	18
Clarkson	1	0	1	0	.000	1	6	3	2	1	0	12	14
Colgate	4	1	3	0	.250	8	14	5	2	3	0	9	14
Columbia	5	1	4	0	.200	21	24	5	1	4	0	21	24
Cornell	5	3	2	0	.600	22	10	5	3	2	0	22	10
Dartmouth	9	5	3	1	.611	24	21	11	6	4	1	30	27
Fordham	–	–	–	–	–	–	–	–	–	–	–	–	–
Hamilton	–	–	–	–	–	–	–	10	10	0	0	–	–
Harvard	6	6	0	0	1.000	42	3	10	8	2	0	55	8
Massachusetts Agricultural	7	3	4	0	.429	18	17	7	3	4	0	18	17
Michigan College of Mines	2	1	1	0	.500	9	5	10	6	4	0	29	21
MIT	6	3	3	0	.500	13	21	7	3	4	0	16	25
New York State	–	–	–	–	–	–	–	–	–	–	–	–	–
Notre Dame	3	2	1	0	.667	7	9	3	2	1	0	7	9
Pennsylvania	8	3	4	1	.438	17	37	9	3	5	1	18	44
Princeton	7	4	3	0	.571	18	16	8	4	4	0	20	23
Rensselaer	4	1	3	0	.250	7	13	4	1	3	0	7	13
Tufts	–	–	–	–	–	–	–	–	–	–	–	–	–
Williams	5	4	1	0	.800	17	10	6	5	1	0	21	10
Yale	8	3	4	1	.438	21	33	10	3	6	1	25	47
YMCA College	6	5	0	1	.917	17	9	7	5	1	1	20	16

== Schedule and results ==
Date	Opponent	Site	Decision	Result	Record
Regular Season
January 8	at Bates*	Lake Andrews Rink • Lewiston, Maine	O'Brien	W 5–0	1–0–0
January 13	vs. MIT*	Boston Arena • Boston, Massachusetts	O'Brien	W 4–3	2–0–0
January 20	Dartmouth*	Boston Arena • Boston, Massachusetts	Urban	W 4–0	3–0–0
January 26	vs. MIT*	Boston Arena • Boston, Massachusetts	McCluskey	L 3–4 ^{OT}	3–1–0
January 29	Amherst*	Alumni Field Rink • Chestnut Hill, Massachusetts	Murphy	W 4–2	4–1–0
January 31	Massachusetts Agricultural*	Boston Arena • Boston, Massachusetts	Urban	W 2–1	5–1–0
February 3	vs. Shoe Trades*	Boston Arena • Boston, Massachusetts	Urban	L 1–7	5–2–0
February 25	vs. MIT*	Boston Arena • Boston, Massachusetts	Urban	W 5–1	6–2–0
*Non-conference game.
