= 1920–21 Williams Ephs men's ice hockey season =

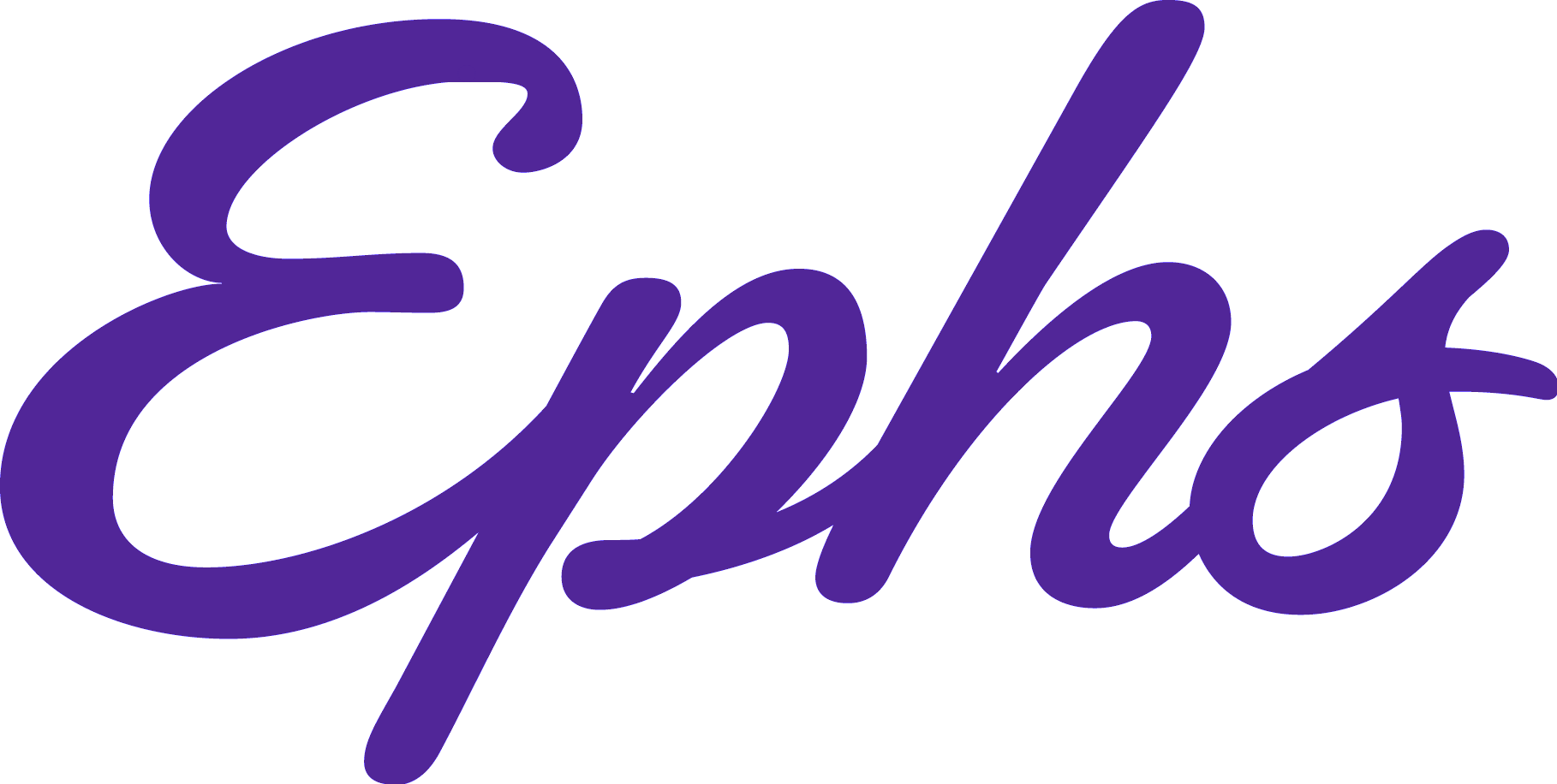
- Conference: Independent
- Home ice: Cole Field House Rink

Record
- Overall: 5–1–0
- Home: 1–0–0
- Road: 4–1–0

Coaches and captains
- Captain: Dudley Irwin

The 1920–21 Williams Ephs men's ice hockey season was the 18th season of play for the program.

== Season ==
As the season was getting underway, Williams put together a slate of nine games with the first coming just before the winter break. Due to the Cole Field House Rink not yet being frozen, the team held all of their practiced inside the Lasell Gymnasium. As the first game neared, however, the weather remained too warm and the match on December 18 with Rensselaer was cancelled. The poor ice would not abate and caused the cancellation of two further games (YMCA College and Harvard) which forced Williams to hit the road.

The team's first game came against the Albany Country Club and, despite the lack of ice time for the players, they were far superior to the amateur group. The Ephs got goals from all three forwards and, though there was still some kinks in their game, the final score of 4–0 was very flattering. A few days later, the team was in Amherst and appeared to be in much better shape, at least as far as teamwork was concerned. Williams played a sound defensive game and limited the Lord Jeffs to few scoring opportunities. While Richmond did allow one goal to get by him, Becket and Clark each found the twine to give the Ephs their second win of the season.

It took several weeks for the next game to happen and, fortunately, the weather had cooled off enough for Cole Field House Rink to be used. Because the ice was choppy, the game was limited to 15 minute halves but that didn't stop Williams from proving that they were the superior team. Once more, each forward scored a goal and the Ephs skated away with a 3–0 win to take the season series over Amherst. When the team headed down to play Columbia, they had to radically alter their lineup for the game. Because the Lions played under the more modern 6-man, 3-period format, Williams was forced to follow suit and alternate between Stephenson and Clark at left wing. Despite the difference in style, Williams was easily the better of the two teams and outskated Columbia throughout the match. Becket scored a hat-trick with Clark and Rowse adding one apiece to give the Purple an easy 5–1 win.

The next game was supposed to be played versus Dartmouth a few days later, but a sudden thaw forced that match to be scrapped. Instead, Williams headed down to play Army and encountered the same problem. The warm winter had rendered the Stuart Rink unusable so the two were forced to play on the Lusk Reservoir. Soft, slushy ice slowed the game down and made passing all but impossible. Somehow, Clark managed to score twice, the second of which came in overtime and won the game for Williams. A week later the team headed up to Hanover for the final game of the year and were doing so in a rarified position. While it would be unlikely for the Ephs to be named as champion, if Williams could finish the year with a spotless record and a win over one of college hockey's powerhouse teams, they would at least have to be considered for the honor. Even with the spotty practice, the team had already proven to be a formidable group. However, as soon as the match began, the Purple had a problem. the opposing rover, Bowers, was a demon on skates and raced up and down the ice. the Williams defense had an impossible task in checking him but did their best to limit his chances. Unfortunately, Dartmouth was able to utilize Bowers' speed to jump out to a 2–0 lead in the first. The Eph forwards clawed back to tie the game by the end of the second but the bottom fell out in the third. Dartmouth scored three timed in the final frame to take the game 6–4 and end Williams' championship hopes.

Phillip S. Patton served as team manager with Donald Crouse as his assistant.

== Roster ==
No.	Nat.	Player	Class	Pos	Height	Weight	DoB	Hometown	Previous team
	(United States)	Alan L. Becket	Junior	C				East Orange, New Jersey
	(United States)	Trescott A. Buell	Junior	D				Pittsfield, Massachusetts
	(United States)	Russell C. Clark	Sophomore	LW			1900-03-23	New Brighton, New York
	(United States)	Dudley M. Irwin Jr.	Senior	D			1899-07-22	Buffalo, New York
	(United States)	John M. Mackie	Sophomore	G			1899-04-11	Great Barrington, Massachusetts
	(United States)	Wallace E. Richmond Jr.	Sophomore	G			1901-09-18	Newtonville, Massachusetts
	(United States)	Richard E. Rowse	Junior	RW			1898-05-07	Lexington, Massachusetts
	(United States)	John A. Stephenson Jr.	Freshman	R			1902-03-20	Duluth, Minnesota
	(United States)	William R. Stephenson	Sophomore	R/LW			1900-05-27	Duluth, Minnesota

== Standings ==
1920–21 College ice hockey standings
	Intercollegiate							Overall					
	GP	W	L	T	Pct.	GF	GA	GP	W	L	T	GF	GA
Amherst	7	0	7	0	.000	8	19	7	0	7	0	8	19
Army	3	0	2	1	.167	6	11	3	0	2	1	6	11
Bates	4	2	2	0	.500	7	8	8	4	4	0	22	20
Boston College	7	6	1	0	.857	27	11	8	6	2	0	28	18
Bowdoin	4	0	3	1	.125	1	10	7	1	5	1	10	23
Buffalo	–	–	–	–	–	–	–	6	0	6	0	–	–
Carnegie Tech	5	0	4	1	.100	4	18	5	0	4	1	4	18
Clarkson	1	0	1	0	.000	1	6	3	2	1	0	12	14
Colgate	4	1	3	0	.250	8	14	5	2	3	0	9	14
Columbia	5	1	4	0	.200	21	24	5	1	4	0	21	24
Cornell	5	3	2	0	.600	22	10	5	3	2	0	22	10
Dartmouth	9	5	3	1	.611	24	21	11	6	4	1	30	27
Fordham	–	–	–	–	–	–	–	–	–	–	–	–	–
Hamilton	–	–	–	–	–	–	–	10	10	0	0	–	–
Harvard	6	6	0	0	1.000	42	3	10	8	2	0	55	8
Massachusetts Agricultural	7	3	4	0	.429	18	17	7	3	4	0	18	17
Michigan College of Mines	2	1	1	0	.500	9	5	10	6	4	0	29	21
MIT	6	3	3	0	.500	13	21	7	3	4	0	16	25
New York State	–	–	–	–	–	–	–	–	–	–	–	–	–
Notre Dame	3	2	1	0	.667	7	9	3	2	1	0	7	9
Pennsylvania	8	3	4	1	.438	17	37	9	3	5	1	18	44
Princeton	7	4	3	0	.571	18	16	8	4	4	0	20	23
Rensselaer	4	1	3	0	.250	7	13	4	1	3	0	7	13
Tufts	–	–	–	–	–	–	–	–	–	–	–	–	–
Williams	5	4	1	0	.800	17	10	6	5	1	0	21	10
Yale	8	3	4	1	.438	21	33	10	3	6	1	25	47
YMCA College	6	5	0	1	.917	17	9	7	5	1	1	20	16

== Schedule and results ==
Date	Opponent	Site	Result	Record
Regular Season
January 15	at Albany Country Club*	Albany Country Club Rink • Albany, New York	W 4–0	1–0–0
January 19	at Amherst*	Pratt Field Rink • Amherst, Massachusetts	W 2–1	2–0–0
February 4	Amherst*	Cole Field House Rink • Williamstown, Massachusetts	W 3–0	3–0–0
February 11	at Columbia*	181st Street Ice Palace • New York, New York	W 5–1	4–0–0
February 19	at Army*	Lusk Reservoir • West Point, New York	W 3–2	5–0–0
February 26	at Dartmouth*	Occom Pond • Hanover, New Hampshire	L 4–6	5–1–0
*Non-conference game.

== Scoring statistics ==
Name	Position	Games	Goals
Alan Becket	C	6	8
Russell Clark	LW	6	8
Richard Rowse	RW	6	4
William Stephenson	R/LW	6	1
John Mackie	G	2	0
Trescott Buell	D	6	0
Dudley Irwin	D	6	0
Wallace Richmond	G	6	0
John Stephenson	R	1	0
Total			21
