= 1920–21 YMCA College Maroons men's ice hockey season =

- Conference: Independent
- Home ice: Pratt Field Rink

Record
- Overall: 5–1–1
- Home: 2–0–0
- Road: 3–1–1

Coaches and captains
- Head coach: Paul Otto
- Captain: Arnold Fink

The 1920–21 YMCA College Maroons men's ice hockey season was the 17th season of play for the program.

== Season ==
The hockey team met for the first time in early December and began to prepare for an 11-game season. Due to a fairly warm winter, the temporary rink was rarely usable for practice and the team was forced to train on the local lake instead.

In spite of the difficulties, including a postponement of a match with Williams, the Maroons were ready to go for their first game at Rensselaer. YMCA netted two goals within the first eight minutes of the game and RPI responded by pulling back and trying to defend. While this curtailed the scoring for the Maroons, it also meant that their goal was not under threat. The Engineers didn't realize their mistake until YMCA made it 3–0 at the start of the second half but by then it was too late. Benny Leonard had missed the team's train when it travelled to Troy but managed to catch a later one. He changed into his equipment en route and ran to the rink from the station, arriving in time to play the final five minutes of the game. The team continued its good start with a win over Amherst a week later. In a very physical game, the Sabrinas opened the scoring less than 5 minutes into the game but were unable to increase their lead. The hitting and rough play increased in the second half and broken sticks littered the ice surface. Fink's goal forced overtime, enabling Delano to put the winning goal while Begg held the fort.

The Maroons headed off to take on Army in their next game. While playing on soft ice, the two teams were evenly matched throughout the contest and were never more than a goal apart. After a scoreless opening half, Fink gave YMCA the lead early in the second. The teams then traded goals until the score was tied at 2-all and YMCA headed into its second overtime game of the year. The extra session saw both teams score once and, due to the fading light, Army decided against a second overtime session so the match was declared a draw. The team returned home for the next game and found the ice equally as soft but, fortunately, still playable. a 2-goal surge from Noren in the second half led the team to victory over an underpowered Tufts club.

Weather had caused the cancellation of several game already but all further matches in Massachusetts were wiped out due to a lack of ice. Luckily, the Maroons were able to take a trip north into Maine and play three games in as many days. They started their road trip by playing the Portland Country Club and played well against a team of former college players. As opposed to their earlier games, this match was divided into three 15-minute periods. For the first two, YMCA matched the home club goal for goal but they could not sustain the effort in the third. If the team's first night game of the year, YMCA surrendered 4 goals in the third to make the game appear more lopsided than it actually was. The following night they faced Bates at the local winter carnival and fought another close, physical game. Starr was singled out for being particularly rough in the match and was removed from the game, however, the defense was able to withstand his loss and limit the Garnet to just one goal. Noren and Fink provided just enough offense for the team to eke out a win and remain unbeaten against collegiate opponents. The third and final game of the trip was played at Bowdoin and the team was beginning to tire. Two hard games sapped some of the team's strength and they appeared sluggish in the first half. Starr and Courtney played a solid defensive game but the Whites were still able to get one past Begg to take an early lead. The Maroons were rejuvenated during the break and overpowered the Polar Bears in the second half. In less than 8 minutes, YMCA scored 4 goals, including a hat-trick from Noren, and swept Bowdoin off of their home surface.

This was by far the best season the program had yet produced. Going undefeated in six games against college opponents put the Maroons into the upper echelon of the small schools and left them with a legitimate claim for the junior intercollegiate championship.

J. Howard Starr served as team manager.

== Roster ==
No.	Nat.	Player	Class	Pos	Height	Weight	DoB	Hometown	Previous team
	(Canada)	Roy H. Begg	Senior	G				Hamilton, Ontario
	(United States)	Walter A. Courtney	Sophomore	D				Maynard, Massachusetts
	(United States)	Chester K. Delano	Junior	F			1899-04-25	Plymouth, Massachusetts
	(United States)	Arnold F. Fink (C)	Senior	F				Schenectady, New York
	(United States)	Albert S. Leonard	Junior	R			1899-02-10	Melrose, Massachusetts
	(United States)	Arthur T. Noren	Senior	F			1899-11-29	Bridgeport, Connecticut
	(United States)	J. Howard Starr	Junior	D			1899-07-16	New Haven, Connecticut
	(Canada)	W. H. Talbot	Freshman					Ottawa, Ontario

== Standings ==
1920–21 College ice hockey standings
	Intercollegiate							Overall					
	GP	W	L	T	Pct.	GF	GA	GP	W	L	T	GF	GA
Amherst	7	0	7	0	.000	8	19	7	0	7	0	8	19
Army	3	0	2	1	.167	6	11	3	0	2	1	6	11
Bates	4	2	2	0	.500	7	8	8	4	4	0	22	20
Boston College	7	6	1	0	.857	27	11	8	6	2	0	28	18
Bowdoin	4	0	3	1	.125	1	10	7	1	5	1	10	23
Buffalo	–	–	–	–	–	–	–	6	0	6	0	–	–
Carnegie Tech	5	0	4	1	.100	4	18	5	0	4	1	4	18
Clarkson	1	0	1	0	.000	1	6	3	2	1	0	12	14
Colgate	4	1	3	0	.250	8	14	5	2	3	0	9	14
Columbia	5	1	4	0	.200	21	24	5	1	4	0	21	24
Cornell	5	3	2	0	.600	22	10	5	3	2	0	22	10
Dartmouth	9	5	3	1	.611	24	21	11	6	4	1	30	27
Fordham	–	–	–	–	–	–	–	–	–	–	–	–	–
Hamilton	–	–	–	–	–	–	–	10	10	0	0	–	–
Harvard	6	6	0	0	1.000	42	3	10	8	2	0	55	8
Massachusetts Agricultural	7	3	4	0	.429	18	17	7	3	4	0	18	17
Michigan College of Mines	2	1	1	0	.500	9	5	10	6	4	0	29	21
MIT	6	3	3	0	.500	13	21	7	3	4	0	16	25
New York State	–	–	–	–	–	–	–	–	–	–	–	–	–
Notre Dame	3	2	1	0	.667	7	9	3	2	1	0	7	9
Pennsylvania	8	3	4	1	.438	17	37	9	3	5	1	18	44
Princeton	7	4	3	0	.571	18	16	8	4	4	0	20	23
Rensselaer	4	1	3	0	.250	7	13	4	1	3	0	7	13
Tufts	–	–	–	–	–	–	–	–	–	–	–	–	–
Williams	5	4	1	0	.800	17	10	6	5	1	0	21	10
Yale	8	3	4	1	.438	21	33	10	3	6	1	25	47
YMCA College	6	5	0	1	.917	17	9	7	5	1	1	20	16

== Schedule and results ==
Date	Opponent	Site	Result	Record
Regular season
January 16	at Rensselaer*	RPI Rink • Troy, New York	W 3–1	1–0–0
January 26	Amherst*	Pratt Field Rink • Springfield, Massachusetts	W 2–1 ^{OT}	2–0–0
January 29	at Army*	Stuart Rink • West Point, New York	T 3–3 ^{OT}	2–0–1
February 6	Tufts*	Pratt Field Rink • Springfield, Massachusetts	W 3–2	3–0–1
February 24	at Portland Country Club*	Country Club Rink • Portland, Maine	L 3–7	3–1–1
February 25	at Bates*	Lake Andrews Rink • Lewiston, Maine	W 2–1	4–1–1
February 26	at Bowdoin*	Delta Rink • Brunswick, Maine	W 4–1	5–1–1
*Non-conference game.

== Scoring statistics ==
Name	Position	Games	Goals
Arthur Noren	RW	7	9
Arnold Fink	C	7	8
Chester Delano	LW	7	2
W. Talbot		2	1
Roy Begg	G	-	0
Walt Courtney	P/CP	-	0
Benny Leonard	R	-	0
Howie Starr	P/CP	-	0
Total			20
