= 1920–21 Massachusetts Agricultural Aggies men's ice hockey season =

- Conference: Independent
- Home ice: Alumni Field Rink

Record
- Overall: 3–4–0
- Home: 2–0–0
- Road: 1–4–0

Coaches and captains
- Head coach: Elton Mansell
- Captain: Jerry McCarthy

The 1920–21 Massachusetts Agricultural Aggies men's ice hockey season was the 13th season of play for the program. The Aggies were coached by Elton Mansell in his 4th season.

== Season ==
The season began with the school building a new rink near Alumni Field which was supposed to have more consistent ice and cut down on the number of games lost to the weather. The veteran team, led by Justin "Jerry" McCarthy, was expected to compete against some of the best teams in college hockey.

After returning from the winter break, the team opened with an exhibition game against the Springfield Hockey Club to help get them into shape for the season. The first official game happened a few days later when they met cross-town rival Amherst and won a narrow victory. Though the score was close, MAC carried the balance of play and allowed just 7 shots from the Lord Jeffs. New entry Harold Poole was integral in keeping Phil Newell's crease clear all night and even managed to open the scoring. A few days later the team travelled up to New Hampshire to take on Dartmouth. The two fought a mostly even battle in the first with coach/rover Sonny Mansell leading the charge but it was the greens who ended the first half on top by a pair. Both squads increased the pace of play in the second half but a pair of quick goals saw the score tied by the efforts of the Aggies' offense. A fast overtime saw both teams get their chances before the Dartmouth captain, Rothchild, netted the winning goal, in the second 5-minute period.

The next game saw the Aggies take on the best team in the nation as they faced Harvard. The Crimson were already well on their way to winning another championship, but Mansell's men were undaunted. In what was possibly their best and fastest game of the year, nearly every player matched their Harvard counterpart, but the Aggies could not overcome the superior conditioning of the Crimson skaters. Harvard scored twice in the third period to win the match, but the Aggies had nevertheless proven themselves to be worthy opponents.

A lack of ice caused the next two games to be postponed which left the Aggies with little practice time ahead of their game with Fordham. The team had a letdown against the Maroons, which was played on a very strange surface. The small 181st Street Ice Palace was not normally used as an ice hockey rink and the two were restricted to 6-players per team. Additionally, the ice had 4 pillars arranged about 20 feet from the boards on either side. Because Fordham used the venue for its practice the team was used to avoiding these impediments while MAC found it very difficult to contend with the obstacles. Worse, the team was called for 5 separate penalties in the game which only served to boost Fordham to a 3–8 drubbing of the Aggies. MAC returned to Boston for a match with Boston College and returned to their earlier form, however, they still ended up on the losing side of the ledger. The two goaltenders starred for most of the match but the forwards shone briefly with spectacular individual efforts. McCarthy's goal came when he stole the puck in front of the BC cage and then whipped it into the goal in one motion. Unfortunately, the final goal came after a blistering run up the ice by Frank Morrissey that culminated with the winning goal. The next night, the Aggies were finally able to end their losing streak by taking down MIT. Newell played another strong game in goal and every save was needed as the teams were tied for most of the match. Mansell broke the tie in the third with a charge from his own zone and beating the Engineer netminder with a quick shot.

MAC was finally able to get in a home game when they played Tufts two days later and were in control of the match from start to finish. Mansell started the scoring in the first half and ended with a hat-trick while four others added scores to finish with a 8–0 win. While the team had a few games left on its schedule, every subsequent match was cancelled due to a lack of ice, thanks to warm weather.

Joseph Evers served as team manager.

== Roster ==
No.	Nat.	Player	Class	Pos	Height	Weight	DoB	Hometown	Previous team
	(United States)	Charles H. Anderson	Senior	LW				Medford, Massachusetts
	(United States)	Herbert L. Collins	Junior	D				Arlington, Massachusetts
	(United States)	Howard R. Gordon	Sophomore	LW				Ipswich, Massachusetts
	(United States)	Harold A. Haskins	Senior	LW			1898-04-02	North Amherst, Massachusetts
	(United States)	John J. Lyons Jr.	Junior	R/C			1900-03-31	Arlington, Massachusetts
	(United States)	Elton J. Mansell	Graduate	R/C			1895-04-28	Cambridge, Massachusetts
	(United States)	Justin J. McCarthy (C)	Senior	RW			1899-01-25	Arlington, Massachusetts
	(United States)	Philip S. Newell	Senior	G				West Newton, Massachusetts
	(United States)	Harold W. Poole	Senior	D				Hudson, Massachusetts
	(United States)	John D. Snow	Senior	R/LW				Arlington, Massachusetts

== Standings ==
1920–21 College ice hockey standings
	Intercollegiate							Overall					
	GP	W	L	T	Pct.	GF	GA	GP	W	L	T	GF	GA
Amherst	7	0	7	0	.000	8	19	7	0	7	0	8	19
Army	3	0	2	1	.167	6	11	3	0	2	1	6	11
Bates	4	2	2	0	.500	7	8	8	4	4	0	22	20
Boston College	7	6	1	0	.857	27	11	8	6	2	0	28	18
Bowdoin	4	0	3	1	.125	1	10	7	1	5	1	10	23
Buffalo	–	–	–	–	–	–	–	6	0	6	0	–	–
Carnegie Tech	5	0	4	1	.100	4	18	5	0	4	1	4	18
Clarkson	1	0	1	0	.000	1	6	3	2	1	0	12	14
Colgate	4	1	3	0	.250	8	14	5	2	3	0	9	14
Columbia	5	1	4	0	.200	21	24	5	1	4	0	21	24
Cornell	5	3	2	0	.600	22	10	5	3	2	0	22	10
Dartmouth	9	5	3	1	.611	24	21	11	6	4	1	30	27
Fordham	–	–	–	–	–	–	–	–	–	–	–	–	–
Hamilton	–	–	–	–	–	–	–	10	10	0	0	–	–
Harvard	6	6	0	0	1.000	42	3	10	8	2	0	55	8
Massachusetts Agricultural	7	3	4	0	.429	18	17	7	3	4	0	18	17
Michigan College of Mines	2	1	1	0	.500	9	5	10	6	4	0	29	21
MIT	6	3	3	0	.500	13	21	7	3	4	0	16	25
New York State	–	–	–	–	–	–	–	–	–	–	–	–	–
Notre Dame	3	2	1	0	.667	7	9	3	2	1	0	7	9
Pennsylvania	8	3	4	1	.438	17	37	9	3	5	1	18	44
Princeton	7	4	3	0	.571	18	16	8	4	4	0	20	23
Rensselaer	4	1	3	0	.250	7	13	4	1	3	0	7	13
Tufts	–	–	–	–	–	–	–	–	–	–	–	–	–
Williams	5	4	1	0	.800	17	10	6	5	1	0	21	10
Yale	8	3	4	1	.438	21	33	10	3	6	1	25	47
YMCA College	6	5	0	1	.917	17	9	7	5	1	1	20	16

== Schedule and results ==
Date	Opponent	Site	Result	Record
Exhibition
January 8	Springfield Hockey Club*	Campus Pond • Amherst, Massachusetts (Exhibition)	W ?	
Regular Season
January 12	Amherst*	Alumni Field Rink • Amherst, Massachusetts	W 2–1	1–0–0
January 15	at Dartmouth*	Occom Pond • Hanover, New Hampshire	L 2–3 ^{2OT}	1–1–0
January 19	at Harvard*	Boston Arena • Boston, Massachusetts	L 0–2	1–2–0
January 29	at Fordham*	181st Street Ice Palace • Manhattan, New York	L 3–8	1–3–0
January 31	at Boston College*	Boston Arena • Boston, Massachusetts	L 1–2	1–4–0
February 1	at MIT*	Boston Arena • Boston, Massachusetts	W 2–1	2–4–0
February 3	Tufts*	Alumni Field Rink • Amherst, Massachusetts	W 8–0	3–4–0
*Non-conference game.

== Scoring statistics ==
Name	Position	Games	Goals
Sonny Mansell	R/C	7	6
Jerry McCarthy	RW	7	4
Hubba Collins	CP	7	3
Sharkey Lyons	R/C	7	2
Harold Poole	P	7	2
John Snow	R/LW	6	1
Charles Anderson	LW	1	0
Harry Haskins	LW	1	0
Doc Gordon	LW	5	0
Phil Newell	G	7	0
Total			18

== Goaltending statistics ==
Name	Games	Minutes	Wins	Losses	Ties	Goals Against	Saves	Shut Outs	SV %	GAA
Phil Newell	7	301	3	4	0	17		1		2.26
Total	7	301	3	4	0	17		1		2.26

Note: goals against average is based upon a 40-minute regulation game.
