= 1920–21 Notre Dame Fighting Irish men's ice hockey season =

- Conference: Independent
- Home ice: Badin Hall Rink

Record
- Overall: 2–1–0
- Road: 2–1–0

Coaches and captains
- Head coach: Paul Castner
- Captain: Paul Castner

The 1920–21 Notre Dame Fighting Irish men's ice hockey season was the 4th season of play for the program. The team was coached by Paul Castner in his 2nd season.

== Season ==
Notre Dame began the season by building a temporary rink next to Badin Hall, then a men's dormitory. A warm winter, however, left the rink in a mostly unusable state and the team was forced to train on the frozen sections of St. Mary's Lake. The team wasn't able to form until mid-January when Paul Castner returned from a trip to Chicago with the necessary equipment such as sticks, pucks and pads.

In spite of all their problems, the team did manage to secure a pair of games against the Michigan College of Mines in early February. After three seasons and nearly a decade of trying, Notre Dame was finally able to play its first intercollegiate game of ice hockey. Short on both practice and experience, the Irish had few expectations for the team and that was born out in the first game, a 2–7 defeat. The players learned quickly, however, and the very next night saw Notre Dame defeat a college opponent for the first time when they evened the series with the Huskies. After returning home, the team received a rather surprising invitation from Carnegie Tech for a game in Pittsburgh. The Tartans themselves were just returning to the game after several years away and believed that a match with the Irish could help boost the profile of their team. Father Cunningham, who oversaw the team, accepted and Notre Dame travelled east for their third and final game of the year. The match allowed the Fighting Irish to establish another program first as they shutout Carnegie Tech and ended the year with a winning record.

== Roster ==
No.	Nat.	Player	Class	Pos	Height	Weight	DoB	Hometown	Previous team
	(United States)	Heartly Anderson		G/D				Hancock, Michigan
	(Canada)	Theodore Bullard		LW				Seaforth, Ontario
	(United States)	Paul H. Castner (C)	Sophomore	C			1897-02-16	Saint Paul, Minnesota
	(United States)	Richard Eldridge		RW				Saint Paul, Minnesota
	(United States)	Norm Feltes		LW				South Bend, Indiana
	(United States)	Neil Flinn		C/D				Superior, Wisconsin
	(Canada)	John Gentles		RW				Parry Sound, Ontario
	(United States)	Edward Gibbs		RW				Saint Paul, Minnesota
	(Canada)	William Gilchrist		D				Sarnia, Ontario
	(Canada)	Anthony Gorman		RW				Edmonton, Alberta
	(United States)	David V. Hayes		G				Hartford, Connecticut
	(United States)	Fred Larson		D				Chicago, Illinois
	(United States)	Donald McDonald		D				Duluth, Minnesota
	(United States)	James Wilcox		LW				Laurium, Michigan

== Standings ==
1920–21 College ice hockey standings
	Intercollegiate							Overall					
	GP	W	L	T	Pct.	GF	GA	GP	W	L	T	GF	GA
Amherst	7	0	7	0	.000	8	19	7	0	7	0	8	19
Army	3	0	2	1	.167	6	11	3	0	2	1	6	11
Bates	4	2	2	0	.500	7	8	8	4	4	0	22	20
Boston College	7	6	1	0	.857	27	11	8	6	2	0	28	18
Bowdoin	4	0	3	1	.125	1	10	7	1	5	1	10	23
Buffalo	–	–	–	–	–	–	–	6	0	6	0	–	–
Carnegie Tech	5	0	4	1	.100	4	18	5	0	4	1	4	18
Clarkson	1	0	1	0	.000	1	6	3	2	1	0	12	14
Colgate	4	1	3	0	.250	8	14	5	2	3	0	9	14
Columbia	5	1	4	0	.200	21	24	5	1	4	0	21	24
Cornell	5	3	2	0	.600	22	10	5	3	2	0	22	10
Dartmouth	9	5	3	1	.611	24	21	11	6	4	1	30	27
Fordham	–	–	–	–	–	–	–	–	–	–	–	–	–
Hamilton	–	–	–	–	–	–	–	10	10	0	0	–	–
Harvard	6	6	0	0	1.000	42	3	10	8	2	0	55	8
Massachusetts Agricultural	7	3	4	0	.429	18	17	7	3	4	0	18	17
Michigan College of Mines	2	1	1	0	.500	9	5	10	6	4	0	29	21
MIT	6	3	3	0	.500	13	21	7	3	4	0	16	25
New York State	–	–	–	–	–	–	–	–	–	–	–	–	–
Notre Dame	3	2	1	0	.667	7	9	3	2	1	0	7	9
Pennsylvania	8	3	4	1	.438	17	37	9	3	5	1	18	44
Princeton	7	4	3	0	.571	18	16	8	4	4	0	20	23
Rensselaer	4	1	3	0	.250	7	13	4	1	3	0	7	13
Tufts	–	–	–	–	–	–	–	–	–	–	–	–	–
Williams	5	4	1	0	.800	17	10	6	5	1	0	21	10
Yale	8	3	4	1	.438	21	33	10	3	6	1	25	47
YMCA College	6	5	0	1	.917	17	9	7	5	1	1	20	16

== Schedule and results ==
Date	Opponent	Site	Result	Record
Regular Season
February 3	at Michigan College of Mines*	Amphidrome • Houghton, Michigan	L 2–7	0–1–0
February 4	vs. Michigan College of Mines*	Calumet Colosseum • Calumet, Michigan	W 3–2	1–1–0
February 9	vs. Carnegie Tech*	Duquesne Garden • Pittsburgh, Pennsylvania	W 2–0	2–1–0
*Non-conference game.
