= 1920–21 MIT Engineers men's ice hockey season =

- Conference: Independent
- Home ice: Boston Arena

Record
- Overall: 3–4–0
- Home: 1–1–0
- Neutral: 2–3–0

Coaches and captains
- Head coach: Chippy Gaw
- Captain: John DuVernet

The 1920–21 MIT Engineers men's ice hockey season was the 20th season of play for the program. The Engineers were coached by Chippy Gaw in his 1st season.

== Season ==
Before the season, MIT was able to secure Chippy Gaw, a professional baseball player, as the team's head coach. The team had trouble getting into shape as there was high demand for the ice at the Boston Arena. The lack of practice caused the team to stumble out of the gate and lose its first two games by an identical 3–4 score. In the second Boston College game, Nickle made nearly 50 saves to secure an overtime win.

After a late goal game them a win over Amherst, the team faced its oldest foe in Harvard at the Arena. While Dan MacNeil scored a pair of goals to bookend the first intermission, the Engineers could not stand up to the crimson onslaught and surrendered 8 goals in the match. The following match provided a surprising victory for Tech when they took down Dartmouth. The win gave the Engineers a chance at a winning record with just 1 game to play. The rubber match with BC would serve as the finale for the season. Unfortunately, the game did not go in Tech's favor. playing with 6-man teams, rather than the 7-aside the Engineers were used to, Tech looked lost in the game and were easily beaten by the hill-toppers.

== Roster ==
No.	Nat.	Player	Class	Pos	Height	Weight	DoB	Hometown	Previous team
	(United States)	John N. DuVernet (C)	Junior				1897-07-08	Jamaica Plain, Massachusetts	West Roxbury High School
	(United States)	Daniel M. MacNeil	Senior				1895-01-31	Nova Scotia	St. Francis Xavier College
		Hugh D. Nickle	Sophomore	G			1900-11-14

== Standings ==
1920–21 College ice hockey standings
	Intercollegiate							Overall					
	GP	W	L	T	Pct.	GF	GA	GP	W	L	T	GF	GA
Amherst	7	0	7	0	.000	8	19	7	0	7	0	8	19
Army	3	0	2	1	.167	6	11	3	0	2	1	6	11
Bates	4	2	2	0	.500	7	8	8	4	4	0	22	20
Boston College	7	6	1	0	.857	27	11	8	6	2	0	28	18
Bowdoin	4	0	3	1	.125	1	10	7	1	5	1	10	23
Buffalo	–	–	–	–	–	–	–	6	0	6	0	–	–
Carnegie Tech	5	0	4	1	.100	4	18	5	0	4	1	4	18
Clarkson	1	0	1	0	.000	1	6	3	2	1	0	12	14
Colgate	4	1	3	0	.250	8	14	5	2	3	0	9	14
Columbia	5	1	4	0	.200	21	24	5	1	4	0	21	24
Cornell	5	3	2	0	.600	22	10	5	3	2	0	22	10
Dartmouth	9	5	3	1	.611	24	21	11	6	4	1	30	27
Fordham	–	–	–	–	–	–	–	–	–	–	–	–	–
Hamilton	–	–	–	–	–	–	–	10	10	0	0	–	–
Harvard	6	6	0	0	1.000	42	3	10	8	2	0	55	8
Massachusetts Agricultural	7	3	4	0	.429	18	17	7	3	4	0	18	17
Michigan College of Mines	2	1	1	0	.500	9	5	10	6	4	0	29	21
MIT	6	3	3	0	.500	13	21	7	3	4	0	16	25
New York State	–	–	–	–	–	–	–	–	–	–	–	–	–
Notre Dame	3	2	1	0	.667	7	9	3	2	1	0	7	9
Pennsylvania	8	3	4	1	.438	17	37	9	3	5	1	18	44
Princeton	7	4	3	0	.571	18	16	8	4	4	0	20	23
Rensselaer	4	1	3	0	.250	7	13	4	1	3	0	7	13
Tufts	–	–	–	–	–	–	–	–	–	–	–	–	–
Williams	5	4	1	0	.800	17	10	6	5	1	0	21	10
Yale	8	3	4	1	.438	21	33	10	3	6	1	25	47
YMCA College	6	5	0	1	.917	17	9	7	5	1	1	20	16

== Schedule and results ==
Date	Opponent	Site	Result	Record
Regular Season
January ?	King's*	Boston Arena • Boston, Massachusetts	L 3–4	0–1–0
January 13	vs. Boston College*	Boston Arena • Boston, Massachusetts	L 3–4	0–2–0
January 26	vs. Boston College*	Boston Arena • Boston, Massachusetts	W 4–3 ^{OT}	1–2–0
January 28	vs. Amherst*	Country Club Rink • Newton, Massachusetts	W 2–1	2–2–0
February 16	vs. Harvard*	Boston Arena • Boston, Massachusetts	L 2–8	2–3–0
February 22	Dartmouth*	Boston Arena • Boston, Massachusetts	W 1–0	3–3–0
February 25	vs. Boston College*	Boston Arena • Boston, Massachusetts	L 1–5	3–4–0
*Non-conference game.
