= 1919–20 Dartmouth men's ice hockey season =

- Conference: Independent
- Home ice: Occom Pond

Record
- Overall: 6–4–0
- Home: 3–1–0
- Road: 2–3–0
- Neutral: 1–0–0

Coaches and captains
- Head coach: Clarence Wanamaker
- Captain(s): Chester Gale; Robert Paisley

The 1919–20 Dartmouth men's ice hockey season was the 14th season of play for the program.

== Season ==
Dartmouth returned to the ice after a year layoff, due in part to the end of World War I. The Greens opened their intercollegiate season with two shutout victories over Tufts but when they encountered Harvard the teams fought a pitched battle for supremacy of the 1920 season. The score was close but Dartmouth fell 3–4. Harvard won all of its remaining games and claimed the intercollegiate championship. The Greens continued to play well against collegiate opponents, surrendering only a single goal over their next four games to finish with an impressive record. Dartmouth was runner-up for the championship once more, and while that could have presaged good things in the near future, head coach Clarence Wanamaker resigned from his position at the end of the season.

Note: Dartmouth College did not possess a moniker for its athletic teams until the 1920s, however, the university had adopted 'Dartmouth Green' as its school color in 1866.

== Roster ==
No.	Nat.	Player	Class	Pos	Height	Weight	DoB	Hometown	Previous team
		Bass		RW
	(United States)	Louis F. Cody	Senior	C/LW			1896-04-20	Cleveland, Ohio
	(United States)	John F. Dorney	Junior	D			1897-06-24	Newtonville, Massachusetts
	(United States)	Herbert E. Duffill	Senior	D			1894-10-23	Dorchester, Massachusetts
	(United States)	George A. Fiske	Senior	D			1897-01-16	Auburndale, Massachusetts
	(United States)	Chester O. Gale (C)	Senior	G			1896-09-27	Warren, Pennsylvania
	(United States)	Robert B. Hall	Freshman	F	5' 8" (1.73 m)	165 lb (75 kg)	1899-10-13	Oak Park, Illinois	Brooklyn Crescents
		Hutchinson		D
		McMillan
	(United States)	Robert J. Paisley (C)	Senior	RW			1896-09-06	Melrose, Massachusetts
	(United States)	William H. Perry	Sophomore	C			1899-09-05	Somerville, Massachusetts
	(United States)	Frank A. Ross Jr.	Junior	RW			1900-07-21	Allston, Massachusetts
	(United States)	John Ross	Senior	D			1896-11-02	Allston, Massachusetts
	(United States)	Ryland J. Rothschild	Junior	R/LW			1899-08-21	Saint Paul, Minnesota
	(United States)	Ralph A. Sunergren	Senior				1898-06-16	Arlington, Massachusetts
	(United States)	Philip H. Threschie	Sophomore	D			1898-11-26	Brookline, Massachusetts

== Standings ==
1919–20 Collegiate ice hockey standings
	Intercollegiate							Overall					
	GP	W	L	T	PCT.	GF	GA	GP	W	L	T	GF	GA
Amherst	2	2	0	0	1.000	4	1	2	2	0	0	4	1
Army	5	3	1	1	.700	20	6	7	4	2	1	26	11
Bates	4	3	1	0	.750	15	6	8	4	4	0	21	19
Boston College	7	5	2	0	.714	41	17	8	6	2	0	45	19
Boston University	2	0	2	0	.000	2	19	2	0	2	0	2	19
Bowdoin	4	1	3	0	.250	6	15	6	2	4	0	17	28
Dartmouth	7	6	1	0	.857	26	5	10	6	4	0	30	16
Fordham	–	–	–	–	–	–	–	–	–	–	–	–	–
Hamilton	–	–	–	–	–	–	–	5	3	2	0	–	–
Harvard	7	7	0	0	1.000	44	10	13	10	3	0	65	33
Massachusetts Agricultural	5	3	2	0	.600	22	10	5	3	2	0	22	10
Michigan College of Mines	0	0	0	0	–	0	0	4	1	2	1	10	16
MIT	6	4	2	0	.667	27	22	8	5	2	1	42	31
New York State	–	–	–	–	–	–	–	–	–	–	–	–	–
Notre Dame	0	0	0	0	–	0	0	2	2	0	0	10	5
Pennsylvania	3	0	2	1	.167	3	13	7	1	5	1	15	35
Princeton	6	1	5	0	.167	13	31	10	2	8	0	22	53
Rensselaer	4	1	3	0	.250	24	8	4	1	3	0	24	8
Tufts	4	0	4	0	.000	4	16	4	0	4	0	4	16
Williams	5	3	2	0	.600	10	9	5	3	2	0	10	9
Yale	4	2	2	0	.500	14	9	9	4	5	0	36	38
YMCA College	–	–	–	–	–	–	–	–	–	–	–	–	–

== Schedule and results ==
Date	Opponent	Site	Result	Record
Regular Season
January 9	vs. Dartmouth Club*	Pavilion Rink • Cambridge, Massachusetts	L 2–3	0–1–0
January 17	Tufts*	Occom Pond • Hanover, New Hampshire	W 5–0	1–1–0
January 23	at Tufts*	Medford, Massachusetts	W 3–0	2–1–0
January 24	at Harvard*	Pavilion Rink • Cambridge, Massachusetts	L 3–4	2–2–0
February 11	Massachusetts Agricultural*	Occom Pond • Hanover, New Hampshire	W 1–0	3–2–0
February 14	at Dartmouth Club*	Occom Pond • Hanover, New Hampshire	L 2–4	3–3–0
February 17	at St. Paul's School*	Concord, New Hampshire	L 0–4	3–4–0
February 5	YMCA College*	Occom Pond • Hanover, New Hampshire	W 6–0	4–4–0
March 1	at Pennsylvania*	Philadelphia Ice Palace • Philadelphia, Pennsylvania	W 5–0	5–4–0
March 2	vs. Princeton*	Philadelphia Ice Palace • Philadelphia, Pennsylvania	W 3–1 ^{4OT}	6–4–0
*Non-conference game.
