= 1919–20 Penn Quakers men's ice hockey season =

- Home ice: Philadelphia Ice Palace

Record
- Overall: 1–5–1
- Home: 1–3–0
- Road: 0–0–1
- Neutral: 0–2–0

Coaches and captains
- Head coach: George Orton
- Captain: Bryan Farah

The 1919–20 Penn Quakers men's ice hockey season was the 8th season of play for the program.

== Season ==
The Program was rekindled after World War I, having been dormant since 1911. Penn alumnus George Orton, a bronze medalist in the steeplechase at the 1900 Summer Olympics, served as head coach for the program's second resurrection. The Philadelphia Ice Palace, which opened on February 14, became Penn's first indoor home.

== Roster ==
No.	Nat.	Player	Class	Pos	Height	Weight	DoB	Hometown	Previous team
		Donald Brett		RW
		Anson Boyd Jr.
		Reese Barkalow
		Iri R. Cope		D
		Bryan Farah (C)		R
		Philip Harvey
		Willis Hazelton
		Charles Jefferys		G
		Richard Kearns Jr.		LW
		Waldo Miner		D
		R. J. O'German
		Samuel Paul
		Andrew C. Pringle	Freshman	C
		George Yeomans

== Standings ==
1919–20 Collegiate ice hockey standings
	Intercollegiate							Overall					
	GP	W	L	T	PCT.	GF	GA	GP	W	L	T	GF	GA
Amherst	2	2	0	0	1.000	4	1	2	2	0	0	4	1
Army	5	3	1	1	.700	20	6	7	4	2	1	26	11
Bates	4	3	1	0	.750	15	6	8	4	4	0	21	19
Boston College	7	5	2	0	.714	41	17	8	6	2	0	45	19
Boston University	2	0	2	0	.000	2	19	2	0	2	0	2	19
Bowdoin	4	1	3	0	.250	6	15	6	2	4	0	17	28
Dartmouth	7	6	1	0	.857	26	5	10	6	4	0	30	16
Fordham	–	–	–	–	–	–	–	–	–	–	–	–	–
Hamilton	–	–	–	–	–	–	–	5	3	2	0	–	–
Harvard	7	7	0	0	1.000	44	10	13	10	3	0	65	33
Massachusetts Agricultural	5	3	2	0	.600	22	10	5	3	2	0	22	10
Michigan College of Mines	0	0	0	0	–	0	0	4	1	2	1	10	16
MIT	6	4	2	0	.667	27	22	8	5	2	1	42	31
New York State	–	–	–	–	–	–	–	–	–	–	–	–	–
Notre Dame	0	0	0	0	–	0	0	2	2	0	0	10	5
Pennsylvania	3	0	2	1	.167	3	13	7	1	5	1	15	35
Princeton	6	1	5	0	.167	13	31	10	2	8	0	22	53
Rensselaer	4	1	3	0	.250	24	8	4	1	3	0	24	8
Tufts	4	0	4	0	.000	4	16	4	0	4	0	4	16
Williams	5	3	2	0	.600	10	9	5	3	2	0	10	9
Yale	4	2	2	0	.500	14	9	9	4	5	0	36	38
YMCA College	–	–	–	–	–	–	–	–	–	–	–	–	–

== Schedule and results ==
Date	Opponent	Site	Result	Record
Regular Season
January 24	at Army*	Stuart Rink • West Point, New York	T 1–1	0–0–1
February 16	Princeton*	Philadelphia Ice Palace • Philadelphia, Pennsylvania	L 2–7	0–1–1
February 18	Lafayette ^{†}*	Philadelphia Ice Palace • Philadelphia, Pennsylvania	W 6–3	1–1–1
February 20	vs. Quaker City*	Philadelphia Ice Palace • Philadelphia, Pennsylvania	L 1–10	1–2–1
March 1	Dartmouth*	Philadelphia Ice Palace • Philadelphia, Pennsylvania	L 0–5	1–3–1
March 20	vs. Quaker City*	Philadelphia Ice Palace • Philadelphia, Pennsylvania	L 2–6	1–4–1
March 27	Aviator's Club*	Philadelphia Ice Palace • Philadelphia, Pennsylvania	L 2–3	1–5–1
*Non-conference game.

† Lafayette was an unofficial club team.
