= 1919–20 Princeton Tigers men's ice hockey season =

College ice hockey season

- Conference: 3rd THL
- Home ice: Philadelphia Auditorium and Ice Palace

Record
- Overall: 2–8–0
- Conference: 0–4–0
- Road: 2–3–0
- Neutral: 0–5–0

Coaches and captains
- Head coach: Stuart Paton
- Captain: Richard Haight

The 1919–20 Princeton Tigers men's ice hockey season was the 20th season of play for the program.

== Season ==
In its first full season since the end of World War I the ice hockey club was looking to regain some of the prestige it had in the early teens. The opportunities and opponents for the Tigers were also expanding, however, college ice hockey was still encountering the same problem it always had; lack of available ice.

Princeton spent a week in Concord, New Hampshire at the St. Paul's School facility which they were able to use to prepare for the start of their season. When they hit the ice in January they played at the Pavilion rink in Cambridge because the Boston Arena had been partially destroyed in a fire and was being rebuilt. The rink was so small that teams were forced to play with 6 players aside for the entire contest. Though they played well the Tigers fell 4–5. The following night Princeton was dominated by Toronto and, despite allowing 11 goals, Maxwell was noted as having played particularly well in the game.

Poor weather caused delays in the construction of the Philadelphia Ice Palace which caused several of the team's games to be rescheduled. They were able to play a game at New Rochelle, losing to the home team 2–4, but playing better with the normal 7 players. The Tigers returned to the Pavilion at the end of the month but several weeks of idleness due to the weather left the team at a disadvantage to Harvard who handed Princeton their fourth loss.

Princeton played the first intercollegiate game at the Philadelphia Ice Palace against Yale, losing 0–4. a few days later the Tigers managed to earn their first win of the season by downing the restarted Pennsylvania squad. After earning a second win over Quaker City Hockey Club the Tigers faced Yale in a rematch. In the second game against the Elis, the teams agreed to play the entire contest at 6-on-6 with three 15-minute periods. This may be the first college game purposefully played under modern conditions.

Princeton played well against Dartmouth, keeping up with their opponents until the fourth overtime period, a new program record. Four nights later, however, the Tigers were routed by Harvard again as the Crimson claimed the Championship.

== Roster ==
No.	Nat.	Player	Class	Pos	Height	Weight	DoB	Hometown	Previous team
		Bell		D
		Conklin		R
	(United States)	Frank H. Cook	Freshman	RW			1899-11-28	Colorado Springs, Colorado
		Francis L. Corcoran	Sophomore	W
		Richard Ehret	Junior	RW
		Richard A. Haight (C)	Junior	D
		Edward L. Keyes	Junior	LW
		Alan G. Knox	Junior	C
		Eugene Maxwell	Sophomore	G
	(United States)	Walter S. MacPhee	Sophomore	G			1899-12-23	Brooklyn, New York
		Schuyler Merritt II	Sophomore	D
		Thomas Raleigh	Senior	F
		John Tallman	Sophomore	RW
		Arthur J. Terry	Senior	R/C/D
		Samuel Welsh	Junior	RW

== Standings ==
1919–20 Collegiate ice hockey standings
	Intercollegiate							Overall					
	GP	W	L	T	PCT.	GF	GA	GP	W	L	T	GF	GA
Amherst	2	2	0	0	1.000	4	1	2	2	0	0	4	1
Army	5	3	1	1	.700	20	6	7	4	2	1	26	11
Bates	4	3	1	0	.750	15	6	8	4	4	0	21	19
Boston College	7	5	2	0	.714	41	17	8	6	2	0	45	19
Boston University	2	0	2	0	.000	2	19	2	0	2	0	2	19
Bowdoin	4	1	3	0	.250	6	15	6	2	4	0	17	28
Dartmouth	7	6	1	0	.857	26	5	10	6	4	0	30	16
Fordham	–	–	–	–	–	–	–	–	–	–	–	–	–
Hamilton	–	–	–	–	–	–	–	5	3	2	0	–	–
Harvard	7	7	0	0	1.000	44	10	13	10	3	0	65	33
Massachusetts Agricultural	5	3	2	0	.600	22	10	5	3	2	0	22	10
Michigan College of Mines	0	0	0	0	–	0	0	4	1	2	1	10	16
MIT	6	4	2	0	.667	27	22	8	5	2	1	42	31
New York State	–	–	–	–	–	–	–	–	–	–	–	–	–
Notre Dame	0	0	0	0	–	0	0	2	2	0	0	10	5
Pennsylvania	3	0	2	1	.167	3	13	7	1	5	1	15	35
Princeton	6	1	5	0	.167	13	31	10	2	8	0	22	53
Rensselaer	4	1	3	0	.250	24	8	4	1	3	0	24	8
Tufts	4	0	4	0	.000	4	16	4	0	4	0	4	16
Williams	5	3	2	0	.600	10	9	5	3	2	0	10	9
Yale	4	2	2	0	.500	14	9	9	4	5	0	36	38
YMCA College	–	–	–	–	–	–	–	–	–	–	–	–	–

1919–20 Triangular Hockey League standings
	Conference								Overall					
	GP	W	L	T	PTS	SW	GF	GA	GP	W	L	T	GF	GA
Harvard *	4	4	0	0	1.000	2	24	8	13	10	3	0	65	33
Yale	4	2	2	0	.500	1	14	9	9	4	5	0	36	38
Princeton	4	0	4	0	.000	0	5	26	10	2	8	0	22	72
* indicates conference champion

== Schedule and results ==
Date	Opponent	Site	Result	Record
Regular Season
January 1	at Harvard Club*	Pavilion Rink • Cambridge, Massachusetts	L 4–5	0–1–0
January 2	vs. Toronto*	Pavilion Rink • Cambridge, Massachusetts	L 0–11	0–2–0
January 17	at New Rochelle*	New Rochelle, New York	L 2–4	0–3–0
January 31	at Harvard	Pavilion Rink • Cambridge, Massachusetts	L 3–6	0–4–0 (0–1–0)
February 14	vs. Yale	Philadelphia Auditorium and Ice Palace • Philadelphia, Pennsylvania	L 0–4	0–5–0 (0–2–0)
February 16	at Pennsylvania*	Philadelphia Auditorium and Ice Palace • Philadelphia, Pennsylvania	W 7–2	1–5–0
February 27	at Quaker City Hockey Club*	Philadelphia Auditorium and Ice Palace • Philadelphia, Pennsylvania	W 3–2	2–5–0
February 28	vs. Yale	Philadelphia Auditorium and Ice Palace • Philadelphia, Pennsylvania	L 1–6	2–6–0 (0–3–0)
March 2	vs. Dartmouth*	Philadelphia Auditorium and Ice Palace • Philadelphia, Pennsylvania	L 1–3 ^{4OT}	2–7–0
March 6	vs. Harvard	Philadelphia Auditorium and Ice Palace • Philadelphia, Pennsylvania	L 1–10	2–8–0 (0–4–0)
*Non-conference game.
