= 1919–20 Amherst men's ice hockey season =

- Conference: Independent

Record
- Overall: 2–0–0
- Road: 2–0–0

Coaches and captains
- Captain: Remington Clark

The 1919–20 Amherst men's ice hockey season was the 7th season of play for the program.

== Season ==
Returning to the ice for the first time since 1914, Amherst was led by team captain Remington Clark. Because the team did not have access to Pratt Field, which they had used prior to the war, the team was relegated to playing all of its games on the road. However, the team persevered and used whatever ice surfaces they could find to train and get themselves into working order. Amherst decided against adopting the new style of play and kept the rover position for the first game. However, because the second match was held on a much smaller rink, the team was forced to play 6-on-6 hockey for the duration.

Amherst managed to schedule and play two games in 1920, both in late-January. The first came at YMCA College and the team got off to a fast start. Allen Davidson got the team an early lead and allowed Sisson and the defense to carry them the rest of the way. Plumer was particularly effective in breaking up several rushes into the Amherst end and the purple were able to shutout Springfield. The second and final game of the year was with cross-town rival Massachusetts Agricultural with good goaltending a feature of the game. Sisson continued his inspired play in the second half and, although he allowed a goal to MAC, the purple were able to ring up three scores on the night and finish with an undefeated record. The following week, Amherst was off to play

Bradford L. Church served as team manager.

Note: Amherst teams did not have any nickname prior to 1921.

== Roster ==
No.	Nat.	Player	Class	Pos	Height	Weight	DoB	Hometown	Previous team
		W. A. Burnett	Senior	C
	(United States)	Remington A. Clark (C)	Junior	R				Springfield, Massachusetts
	(United States)	Allen Davidson	Sophomore	RW			1901-08-04	Auburndale, Massachusetts
	(United States)	Frank F. Davidson Jr.	Senior	D				Auburndale, Massachusetts
	(United States)	Robert K. Metcalf	Junior	LW			1899-11-21	Arlington, Massachusetts
	(United States)	Leonidas N. Plumer	Sophomore	D				Newton Center, Massachusetts
	(United States)	Arthur C. Sisson	Senior	G			1898-11-24	Edgewood, Rhode Island

== Standings ==
1919–20 Collegiate ice hockey standings
	Intercollegiate							Overall					
	GP	W	L	T	PCT.	GF	GA	GP	W	L	T	GF	GA
Amherst	2	2	0	0	1.000	4	1	2	2	0	0	4	1
Army	5	3	1	1	.700	20	6	7	4	2	1	26	11
Bates	4	3	1	0	.750	15	6	8	4	4	0	21	19
Boston College	7	5	2	0	.714	41	17	8	6	2	0	45	19
Boston University	2	0	2	0	.000	2	19	2	0	2	0	2	19
Bowdoin	4	1	3	0	.250	6	15	6	2	4	0	17	28
Dartmouth	7	6	1	0	.857	26	5	10	6	4	0	30	16
Fordham	–	–	–	–	–	–	–	–	–	–	–	–	–
Hamilton	–	–	–	–	–	–	–	5	3	2	0	–	–
Harvard	7	7	0	0	1.000	44	10	13	10	3	0	65	33
Massachusetts Agricultural	5	3	2	0	.600	22	10	5	3	2	0	22	10
Michigan College of Mines	0	0	0	0	–	0	0	4	1	2	1	10	16
MIT	6	4	2	0	.667	27	22	8	5	2	1	42	31
New York State	–	–	–	–	–	–	–	–	–	–	–	–	–
Notre Dame	0	0	0	0	–	0	0	2	2	0	0	10	5
Pennsylvania	3	0	2	1	.167	3	13	7	1	5	1	15	35
Princeton	6	1	5	0	.167	13	31	10	2	8	0	22	53
Rensselaer	4	1	3	0	.250	24	8	4	1	3	0	24	8
Tufts	4	0	4	0	.000	4	16	4	0	4	0	4	16
Williams	5	3	2	0	.600	10	9	5	3	2	0	10	9
Yale	4	2	2	0	.500	14	9	9	4	5	0	36	38
YMCA College	–	–	–	–	–	–	–	–	–	–	–	–	–

== Schedule and results ==
Date	Opponent	Site	Result	Record
Regular Season
January 17	at YMCA College*	Pratt Field Rink • Springfield, Massachusetts	W 1–0	1–0–0
January 20	at Massachusetts Agricultural*	Campus Pond • Amherst, Massachusetts	W 3–1	2–0–0
*Non-conference game.
