= 1919–20 Bowdoin Polar Bears men's ice hockey season =

- Conference: Independent
- Home ice: Hyde Hall Rink

Record
- Overall: 2–4–0
- Home: 0–1–0
- Road: 2–3–0

Coaches and captains
- Captain: Eben Page

The 1919–20 Bowdoin Polar Bears men's ice hockey season was the inaugural season of play for the program.

== Season ==
With college hockey now out of the shadow of World War I, Bowdoin fielded its first official ice hockey team. The school allowed a rink to be built on campus between Hubbard and Hyde Halls for the club and hoped to be able to put together a schedule that included other Maine schools. Due to the area available, the dimensions of the rink were 125' by 52'. This was far smaller than the modern rink size of 200' by 85', however, it was not uncommon at the time for colleges to use smaller skating surfaces. A bigger surprise came soon after construction of the rink commenced when the athletic council announced that ice hockey would immediately become a 'major' sport. Hockey had only been informally played at the school prior to the war but the athletic council decided to make the change in the light of other local schools, particularly Bates, Colby and Maine, progressing towards programs of their own.

Page, the team's manager, conducted practice while trying to put a slate of games together but he was finding it difficult to secure meetings on such short notice. The team was supposed to play its first official game on January 17 against the Canadian Club of Portland but poor weather forced the match to be cancelled. However, a few days later, Bowdoin travelled to Lewiston and faced off against Bates in the program's debut. In front of a crowd of about 300, Bowdoin went down to defeat but acquitted themselves well. Morrell scored the program's first goal while Page played well in the match. Three days later the Whites earned their first win when they downed the Portland Country Club 6–4. While not employing a rover, as they had done in the first game, the offense seemed much more cohesive. Morrell nabbed the first hat-trick in program history and captured the laurels for the game along with Page. There was hope that the team could continue its strong play in the rematch with Bates and, while the offense did play better, the defense was not able to pull its own weight. The Garnet scored 9 goals in the game, with Provost recording a double hat-trick, and were just too much for Bowdoin to overcome. Morrell netter a pair of goals to continue his strong season but it wasn't nearly enough to keep pace with Bates.

The team took a break afterwards for the exam session and didn't play their next match until mid-February. Upon their return they faced the Portland Country Club in a rematch but hadn't solved any of their defensive problems. Despite scoring 5 goals, they surrendered 9 in the match and lost in another sloppy effort. After two bad losses, the team made several changes to the lineup. Richardson replaced Doherty in goal while Morrell was dropped back to cover point, swapping spots with Curtis. The changes brought about a far superior defensive effort from the Whites when Bowdoin took on Bates and, though they lost the match, they only surrendered a single goal to the Garnet. The final game, the fourth of the season against Bates, took place the following evening and Bowdoin was finally able to get one over on their in-state rivals. Curtis scored his only goal of the season to lead the team to a 1–0 victory. Richardson was in goal for the program's first shutout.

== Roster ==
No.	Nat.	Player	Class	Pos	Height	Weight	DoB	Hometown	Previous team
	(United States)	William W. Curtis Jr.	Senior	D/W			1898-03-27	Pawtucket, Rhode Island
	(United States)	Paul E. Doherty	Senior	G			1893-05-15	Fall River, Massachusetts
	(United States)	Percy E. Graves	Senior	D			1897-02-09	Brunswick, Maine
	(United States)	Leon Leighton Jr.	Senior	LW			1897-06-27	Portland, Maine
	(United States)	Allen E. Morrell	Sophomore	D/RW			1897-07-07	Hyde Park, Massachusetts
	(United States)	Eben B. Page	Sophomore	C			1898-06-12	Winchester, Massachusetts
	(United States)	Raymond G. Putnam	Sophomore	D			1900-05-05	Danvers, Massachusetts
	(United States)	Jeffrey Richardson Jr.	Sophomore	G			1898-10-23	Brookline, Massachusetts
	(United States)	Dewees F. Tice	Freshman	R/LW			1903-02-19	Boston, Massachusetts
	(United States)	Victor S. Whitman	Freshman	R/LW			1901-04-05	Canton, Maine
	(United States)	Merritt L. Willson	Junior	D/RW			1899-09-27	Sussex, New Jersey

== Standings ==
1919–20 Collegiate ice hockey standings
	Intercollegiate							Overall					
	GP	W	L	T	PCT.	GF	GA	GP	W	L	T	GF	GA
Amherst	2	2	0	0	1.000	4	1	2	2	0	0	4	1
Army	5	3	1	1	.700	20	6	7	4	2	1	26	11
Bates	4	3	1	0	.750	15	6	8	4	4	0	21	19
Boston College	7	5	2	0	.714	41	17	8	6	2	0	45	19
Boston University	2	0	2	0	.000	2	19	2	0	2	0	2	19
Bowdoin	4	1	3	0	.250	6	15	6	2	4	0	17	28
Dartmouth	7	6	1	0	.857	26	5	10	6	4	0	30	16
Fordham	–	–	–	–	–	–	–	–	–	–	–	–	–
Hamilton	–	–	–	–	–	–	–	5	3	2	0	–	–
Harvard	7	7	0	0	1.000	44	10	13	10	3	0	65	33
Massachusetts Agricultural	5	3	2	0	.600	22	10	5	3	2	0	22	10
Michigan College of Mines	0	0	0	0	–	0	0	4	1	2	1	10	16
MIT	6	4	2	0	.667	27	22	8	5	2	1	42	31
New York State	–	–	–	–	–	–	–	–	–	–	–	–	–
Notre Dame	0	0	0	0	–	0	0	2	2	0	0	10	5
Pennsylvania	3	0	2	1	.167	3	13	7	1	5	1	15	35
Princeton	6	1	5	0	.167	13	31	10	2	8	0	22	53
Rensselaer	4	1	3	0	.250	24	8	4	1	3	0	24	8
Tufts	4	0	4	0	.000	4	16	4	0	4	0	4	16
Williams	5	3	2	0	.600	10	9	5	3	2	0	10	9
Yale	4	2	2	0	.500	14	9	9	4	5	0	36	38
YMCA College	–	–	–	–	–	–	–	–	–	–	–	–	–

== Schedule and results ==
Date	Opponent	Site	Decision	Result	Record
Regular Season
January 21	at Bates*	Lake Andrews Rink • Lewiston, Maine	Doherty	L 1–5	0–1–0
January 24	at Portland Country Club*	Country Club Rink • Portland, Maine	Doherty	W 6–4	1–1–0
January 28	at Bates*	Lake Andrews Rink • Lewiston, Maine	Doherty	L 4–9	1–2–0
February 14	at Portland Country Club*	Hyde Hall Rink • Brunswick, Maine	Doherty	L 5–9	1–3–0
February 26	at Bates*	Lake Andrews Rink • Lewiston, Maine	Richardson	L 0–1	1–4–0
February 27	at Bates*	Lake Andrews Rink • Lewiston, Maine	Richardson	W 1–0	2–4–0
*Non-conference game.

== Scoring statistics ==
Name	Position	Games	Goals
Allen Morrell	CP/RW	6	8
Eben Page	C	6	5
William Curtis	CP/LW/RW	5	1
Leon Leighton	LW	5	1
Raymond Putnam	P	6	1
Percy Graves	CP	1	0
Merritt Willson	CP/RW	2	0
Jeffrey Richardson	G	2	0
Dewees Tice	R/LW	2	0
Victor Whitman	R/LW	2	0
Paul Doherty	G	4	0
Total			16

Note: The scorer of the second goal in the game on January 24 was not recorded.
