= 1919–20 Yale Bulldogs men's ice hockey season =

College ice hockey season

- Conference: 2nd THL
- Home ice: Philadelphia Auditorium and Ice Palace

Record
- Overall: 4–5–0
- Conference: 2–2–0
- Road: 2–3–0
- Neutral: 2–2–0

Coaches and captains
- Head coach: Talbot Hunter
- Captain: David Ingalls

The 1919–20 Yale Bulldogs men's ice hockey season was the 25th season of play for the program.

== Season ==
Yale appointed former Cornell bench boss Talbot Hunter as head coach, the first for the team since 1917. Owing to not having a home rink for the season, Yale began with a series of road games mostly against Canadian colleges during the winter break.

The delay in completion of the Philadelphia Ice Palace forced the Elis to play only one further game before February. Once the Ice Palace was ready Yale managed to finish out their slate of conference games for the first season of the Triangular Hockey League. They were able to defeat Princeton twice but fell to Harvard in both matches, finishing second in the Triangular League.

Yale played seven of their nine games under the 6-on-6 with three periods format with only the first Princeton and second Harvard game being played at their more usual 7-on-7 with two halves.

== Roster ==
No.	Nat.	Player	Class	Pos	Height	Weight	DoB	Hometown	Previous team
		Allen
		Robert Carson III	Junior	C/RW	5' 5" (1.65 m)	125 lb (57 kg)			St. Paul's School
	(United States)	Francis P. Day	Senior	G/D			1896-11-02	Hartford, Connecticut
		Lawrence Foster	Junior	LW					St. Paul's School
		David S. Ingalls (C)	Senior	C	6' 0" (1.83 m)	170 lb (77 kg)	1899-01-28	Cleveland, Ohio	St. Paul's School
	(United States)	Blake L. Lawrence	Senior	LW			1898-02-28	Elizabeth, New Jersey
	(United States)	William C. Moffatt Jr.	Junior	RW			1897-01-22	Huron, Indiana
		Malcolm Oakes	Senior	C
		Joseph W. Sargent	Senior	RW	5' 10.5" (1.79 m)	150 lb (68 kg)
	(United States)	Nelson J. Smith	Senior	D	5' 9" (1.75 m)	150 lb (68 kg)		Syracuse, New York
		Edward H. Van Ingen Jr.	Junior	D			1898-10-18
		Walker		G
	(United States)	Douglas R. Wilson	Senior	D	5' 7.5" (1.71 m)	140 lb (64 kg)	1898-01-26

== Standings ==
1919–20 Collegiate ice hockey standings
	Intercollegiate							Overall					
	GP	W	L	T	PCT.	GF	GA	GP	W	L	T	GF	GA
Amherst	2	2	0	0	1.000	4	1	2	2	0	0	4	1
Army	5	3	1	1	.700	20	6	7	4	2	1	26	11
Bates	4	3	1	0	.750	15	6	8	4	4	0	21	19
Boston College	7	5	2	0	.714	41	17	8	6	2	0	45	19
Boston University	2	0	2	0	.000	2	19	2	0	2	0	2	19
Bowdoin	4	1	3	0	.250	6	15	6	2	4	0	17	28
Dartmouth	7	6	1	0	.857	26	5	10	6	4	0	30	16
Fordham	–	–	–	–	–	–	–	–	–	–	–	–	–
Hamilton	–	–	–	–	–	–	–	5	3	2	0	–	–
Harvard	7	7	0	0	1.000	44	10	13	10	3	0	65	33
Massachusetts Agricultural	5	3	2	0	.600	22	10	5	3	2	0	22	10
Michigan College of Mines	0	0	0	0	–	0	0	4	1	2	1	10	16
MIT	6	4	2	0	.667	27	22	8	5	2	1	42	31
New York State	–	–	–	–	–	–	–	–	–	–	–	–	–
Notre Dame	0	0	0	0	–	0	0	2	2	0	0	10	5
Pennsylvania	3	0	2	1	.167	3	13	7	1	5	1	15	35
Princeton	6	1	5	0	.167	13	31	10	2	8	0	22	53
Rensselaer	4	1	3	0	.250	24	8	4	1	3	0	24	8
Tufts	4	0	4	0	.000	4	16	4	0	4	0	4	16
Williams	5	3	2	0	.600	10	9	5	3	2	0	10	9
Yale	4	2	2	0	.500	14	9	9	4	5	0	36	38
YMCA College	–	–	–	–	–	–	–	–	–	–	–	–	–

1919–20 Triangular Hockey League standings
	Conference								Overall					
	GP	W	L	T	PTS	SW	GF	GA	GP	W	L	T	GF	GA
Harvard *	4	4	0	0	1.000	2	24	8	13	10	3	0	65	33
Yale	4	2	2	0	.500	1	14	9	9	4	5	0	36	38
Princeton	4	0	4	0	.000	0	5	26	10	2	8	0	22	72
* indicates conference champion

== Schedule and results ==
Date	Opponent	Site	Result	Record
Regular season
December 30	at Hamilton Tigers*	Barton Street Arena • Hamilton, Ontario	L 5–10	0–1–0
December 31	at Queen's*	Kingston, Ontario	L 6–8	0–2–0
January 1	at Brockville Hockey Club*	Kingston, Ontario	W 7–4	1–2–0
January 2	at St. Michael's*	Toronto, Ontario	W 3–2	2–2–0
January 3	vs. Welland Hockey Club*	Buffalo, New York	L 1–5	2–3–0
January 17	at Harvard	Pavilion Rink • Cambridge, Massachusetts (Rivalry)	L 4–5	2–4–0 (0–1–0)
February 14	vs. Princeton	Philadelphia Auditorium and Ice Palace • Philadelphia, Pennsylvania	W 4–0	3–4–0 (1–1–0)
February 21	vs. Harvard	Philadelphia Auditorium and Ice Palace • Philadelphia, Pennsylvania (Rivalry)	L 0–3	3–5–0 (1–2–0)
February 28	vs. Princeton	Philadelphia Auditorium and Ice Palace • Philadelphia, Pennsylvania	W 6–1	4–5–0 (2–2–0)
*Non-conference game.
