= 1919–20 Harvard Crimson men's ice hockey season =

College ice hockey season

Intercollegiate Champion Triangular Hockey League, Champion
- Conference: 1st Triangular League
- Home ice: Pavilion Rink

Record
- Overall: 10–3–0
- Conference: 4–0–0
- Home: 6–1–0
- Neutral: 4–2–0

Coaches and captains
- Head coach: William Claflin
- Captain: Norman Walker

The 1919–20 Harvard Crimson men's ice hockey season was the 22nd season of play for the program.

== Season ==
After a successful return in 1919, the hockey team had high hopes for a return to glory in the first full season since the end of World War I. First, however, they would have to overcome a few difficulties. Alfred Winsor, the coach who had instilled a tremendous defensive system and led the team to 7 intercollegiate championships, would not return to the program. The team decided to hire another Crimson grad with William Henry Claflin Jr. becoming the second coach in team history. Secondly, with the Boston Arena still undergoing repairs due to a fire, the university would have to find a new home for the year. With the St. Nicholas Rink now closed for hockey and the opening of the Philadelphia Ice Palace delayed, Harvard was able to secure the small Cambridge Ice Pavilion for many of its early games.

Due to the small size of the rink, all games that took place there were restricted to six players on each side, rather than the normal seven for college games. Additionally, many of the game were played using three 15-minute periods rather than two 20-minute halves. The changes known well ahead of time but the team may still have been put off by the strangeness in their games because the Crimson lost the first three games of their season. Fortunately, none were to other colleges and when they opened the inaugural Triangular Hockey League season against Yale, Harvard was able to overcome a 3-goal middle frame from the Elis with one of their own in the third to win the game 5–4. The next game against the Dartmouth Club saw a return to 20-minute halves, but the match progressed similarly with the opponents building a multi-goal lead that Harvard was just able to overcome and claim victory.

Three nights later Harvard downed the official team from Dartmouth and were beginning to get used to the style of play necessitated by the size of the Pavilion. By the time Harvard played Tufts they had rounded into form and dominated the Jumbos 8–0 while using their alternates for most of the game. The offensive heart of the team, Edward Bigelow, returned from an injury just in time for the first game against Princeton. After the Tigers opened the scoring, Bigelow tied the game and set up an offensive deluge that resulted in a 4–1 lead after the first period. The teams played tighter in the final two frames but Harvard's defense was up to the task and the Crimson responded to every Tiger goal to take the game by a final score of 6–3.

A 5-goal game from Bigelow paced the team in their 8–0 win over MIT But the team was far more impressive in their 4–3 win over the Boston All Stars. Even with several fluky goals, and a bit of controversy over the game-winner, Harvard was able to run their winning streak to 7 games at the end of the most strenuous stretch of their season. Harvard won one more home game before preparing to head south and play Yale at the Philadelphia Ice Palace.

With the game played on a surface even larger than modern Olympic rinks, Harvard was dominant throughout the game, their first 7-on-7 match of the season. Only through the brilliant goaltending of Walker was Harvard's score limited to 3 goals. The win gave the season series to Harvard as well as the intercollegiate championship. The Crimson still had to finish their series with Princeton, but the Tigers' record was so poor that even if they were to win the series Harvard would still possess the crown for 1920. In the end, however, Princeton proved no match for Harvard and the Crimson were able to post their biggest victory over the Tigers to that point with a 10–1 win. Captain Walker left the game late with a broken nose but that minor injury couldn't detract from the overpowering performance that cemented Harvard's ninth Intercollegiate Championship.

Harvard was reported as both the Intercollegiate Champion and Eastern Intercollegiate Champion at the time. While the midwestern schools had just begun their programs and they would not regularly play the eastern teams for several years, none played more than a handful of games and most matches were not intercollegiate contests. This left Harvard with a claim for a unified National Championship, the last such claim until 1948.

== Roster ==
No.	Nat.	Player	Class	Pos	Height	Weight	DoB	Hometown	Previous team
	(United States)	Donald Angier	Sophomore	LW			1900-01-12	Newton, Massachusetts	Taft School
	(United States)	Thomas M. Avery	Junior	C/RW			1898-08-03	Chicago, Illinois	St. Paul's School
	(United States)	Francis M. Bacon III	Junior	LW			1899-05-14	Short Hills, New Jersey	St. Paul's School
	(United States)	Charles W. Baker	Sophomore	RW			1900-12-18	New York, New York	St. Paul's School
	(United States)	George S. Baldwin	Junior	C			1898-12-03	Chestnut Hill, Massachusetts	Phillips Academy
	(United States)	Edward L. Bigelow	Junior	C			1899-04-19	Boston, Massachusetts	St. Mark's School
	(United States)	Henry F. Colt	Sophomore	D			1900-04-21	Lakewood, New Jersey	St. Paul's School
	(United States)	Robert W. Emmons	Senior	RW			1897-07-11	Bourne, Massachusetts	Groton School
	(United States)	John Gaston	Junior	RW			1898-12-10	Boston, Massachusetts	St. Mark's School
	(United States)	Mitchell Gratwick	Sophomore	D			1900-05-19	Buffalo, New York	Phillips Academy
	(United States)	Jabish Holmes Jr.	Junior	G			1899-03-11	Pelham Manor, New York	Middlesex School
	(United States)	William J. Louderback	Senior	G			1898-05-03	Chicago, Illinois	St. Paul's School
	(United States)	John M. Martin	Sophomore	RW			1900-05-09	Manchester, New Hampshire	Pomfret School
	(United States)	Henry B. W. Snelling	Senior	F			1899-02-14	Newton Center, Massachusetts	St. Mark's School
	(United States)	Joseph Stubbs	Senior	D			1899-04-28	Newton, Massachusetts	Newton High School
	(United States)	Norman S. Walker (C)	Senior	D			1897-12-21	Castleton Corners, New York	St. Paul's School

== Standings ==
1919–20 Collegiate ice hockey standings
	Intercollegiate							Overall					
	GP	W	L	T	PCT.	GF	GA	GP	W	L	T	GF	GA
Amherst	2	2	0	0	1.000	4	1	2	2	0	0	4	1
Army	5	3	1	1	.700	20	6	7	4	2	1	26	11
Bates	4	3	1	0	.750	15	6	8	4	4	0	21	19
Boston College	7	5	2	0	.714	41	17	8	6	2	0	45	19
Boston University	2	0	2	0	.000	2	19	2	0	2	0	2	19
Bowdoin	4	1	3	0	.250	6	15	6	2	4	0	17	28
Dartmouth	7	6	1	0	.857	26	5	10	6	4	0	30	16
Fordham	–	–	–	–	–	–	–	–	–	–	–	–	–
Hamilton	–	–	–	–	–	–	–	5	3	2	0	–	–
Harvard	7	7	0	0	1.000	44	10	13	10	3	0	65	33
Massachusetts Agricultural	5	3	2	0	.600	22	10	5	3	2	0	22	10
Michigan College of Mines	0	0	0	0	–	0	0	4	1	2	1	10	16
MIT	6	4	2	0	.667	27	22	8	5	2	1	42	31
New York State	–	–	–	–	–	–	–	–	–	–	–	–	–
Notre Dame	0	0	0	0	–	0	0	2	2	0	0	10	5
Pennsylvania	3	0	2	1	.167	3	13	7	1	5	1	15	35
Princeton	6	1	5	0	.167	13	31	10	2	8	0	22	53
Rensselaer	4	1	3	0	.250	24	8	4	1	3	0	24	8
Tufts	4	0	4	0	.000	4	16	4	0	4	0	4	16
Williams	5	3	2	0	.600	10	9	5	3	2	0	10	9
Yale	4	2	2	0	.500	14	9	9	4	5	0	36	38
YMCA College	–	–	–	–	–	–	–	–	–	–	–	–	–

1919–20 Triangular Hockey League standings
	Conference								Overall					
	GP	W	L	T	PTS	SW	GF	GA	GP	W	L	T	GF	GA
Harvard *	4	4	0	0	1.000	2	24	8	13	10	3	0	65	33
Yale	4	2	2	0	.500	1	14	9	9	4	5	0	36	38
Princeton	4	0	4	0	.000	0	5	26	10	2	8	0	22	72
* indicates conference champion

== Schedule and results ==
Date	Opponent	Site	Result	Record
Regular Season
January 3	Toronto*	Pavilion Rink • Cambridge, Massachusetts	L 2–5	0–1–0
January 7	vs. Harvard Club*	Pavilion Rink • Cambridge, Massachusetts	L 1–3	0–2–0
January 10	vs. Boston Athletic Association*	Pavilion Rink • Cambridge, Massachusetts	L 4–5	0–3–0
January 17	Yale	Pavilion Rink • Cambridge, Massachusetts (Rivalry)	W 5–4	1–3–0 (1–0–0)
January 21	Dartmouth Club*	Pavilion Rink • Cambridge, Massachusetts	W 4–3	2–3–0
January 24	Dartmouth*	Pavilion Rink • Cambridge, Massachusetts	W 4–2	3–3–0
January 30	Tufts*	Pavilion Rink • Cambridge, Massachusetts	W 8–0	4–3–0
January 31	Princeton	Pavilion Rink • Cambridge, Massachusetts	W 6–3	5–3–0 (2–0–0)
February 4	vs. MIT*	Pavilion Rink • Cambridge, Massachusetts	W 8–0	6–3–0
February 7	vs. Boston All Stars*	Pavilion Rink • Cambridge, Massachusetts	W 4–3	7–3–0
February 14	Sherbrook Hockey*	Pavilion Rink • Cambridge, Massachusetts	W 6–4	8–3–0
February 21	vs. Yale	Philadelphia Ice Palace • Philadelphia, Pennsylvania (Rivalry)	W 3–0	9–3–0 (3–0–0)
March 6	vs. Princeton	Philadelphia Ice Palace • Philadelphia, Pennsylvania	W 10–1	10–3–0 (4–0–0)
*Non-conference game.
