= 1919–20 Bates men's ice hockey season =

Intercollegiate hockey season

- Conference: Independent
- Home ice: Lake Andrews

Record
- Overall: 4–4–0
- Home: 3–3–0
- Road: 0–1–0
- Neutral: 1–0–0

Coaches and captains
- Head coach: Carl H. Smith
- Captain: Ralph Burns

The 1919–20 Bates men's ice hockey season was the inaugural season of play for the program.

== Season ==
After several years of informal teams being organized by students, Bates decided to support a varsity ice hockey team for the first time. Because the school delayed the decision, the team had only a short time to arrange a schedule and ended up playing Bowdoin in four of their seven games. In spite of the hasty arrangement, Bates played a local aggregation first and won their opening match 3–0. Bates then tortured Bowdoin with a pair of dominant performances. After Sauvage netted a hat-trick in the first meeting, Provost posted 6 goals in the rematch. In between those matches, the team suffered its first loss of the year in overtime. The first road game for the team was a fast match that needed three separate 5-minute overtimes to decide but a shot that deflected off of captain Burns' stick past Wiggin doomed the garnet skaters.

The rematch with Portland went about as well as the first while an amateur team from Canada, called the Nibrocks of La Tuque, arrived in early February and handed the team another loss. While Bates was able to keep up with the foreigners in the game, the lack of teamwork allowed the Canadians to block any offense the team managed to put together. Bates then ended its season by splitting a pair of games with Bowdoin during the winter carnival. The score of the each match was 1–0 with Bates taking the first before seeing the Bears finally win one of their own. Poor ice conditions slowed the games down

Note: Bates did not adopt the 'Bobcats' moniker until 1924.

== Roster ==
No.	Nat.	Player	Class	Pos	Height	Weight	DoB	Hometown	Previous team
	(United States)	Carl W. Belmore	Junior	C			1899-05-07	Wakefield, Massachusetts
	(United States)	Romeo A. Bernard	Junior	RW			1897-11-03	Auburn, Maine
	(United States)	Gerald H. Buker	Senior	D/F			1897-11-05	Waterbury, Vermont
	(United States)	Ralph A. Burns (C)	Senior	D/F			1897-04-05	Vinalhaven, Maine
	(United States)	Chester F. Cleaves	Freshman				1901-10-13	Buxton, Maine
	(United States)	Felix V. Cutler	Junior	R/RW			1894-02-24	Brookline, Massachusetts
		Raymond L. Kendall	Junior
		John Mosher		D
		Romeo R. Provost	Sophomore	LW/RW			1896-10-04
	(United States)	Edward F. Roberts	Freshman	C/RW			1901-10-14	Presque Isle, Maine
	(United States)	Carl P. Rounds	Sophomore	RW			1898-01-01	Minot, Maine
		Norman J. Sauvage	Freshman	D			1897-03-22
	(United States)	Leighton G. Tracy	Senior	D			1897-12-15	Boston, Massachusetts
	(United States)	Ervin E. Trask	Senior	LW			1899-07-24	Fairfield, Maine
	(United States)	Carleton L. Wiggin	Junior	G			1897-07-29	Dover, New Hampshire
	(United States)	Donald K. Woodard	Junior	D/LW			1897-02-28	Colebrook, New Hampshire

== Standings ==
1919–20 Collegiate ice hockey standings
	Intercollegiate							Overall					
	GP	W	L	T	PCT.	GF	GA	GP	W	L	T	GF	GA
Amherst	2	2	0	0	1.000	4	1	2	2	0	0	4	1
Army	5	3	1	1	.700	20	6	7	4	2	1	26	11
Bates	4	3	1	0	.750	15	6	8	4	4	0	21	19
Boston College	7	5	2	0	.714	41	17	8	6	2	0	45	19
Boston University	2	0	2	0	.000	2	19	2	0	2	0	2	19
Bowdoin	4	1	3	0	.250	6	15	6	2	4	0	17	28
Dartmouth	7	6	1	0	.857	26	5	10	6	4	0	30	16
Fordham	–	–	–	–	–	–	–	–	–	–	–	–	–
Hamilton	–	–	–	–	–	–	–	5	3	2	0	–	–
Harvard	7	7	0	0	1.000	44	10	13	10	3	0	65	33
Massachusetts Agricultural	5	3	2	0	.600	22	10	5	3	2	0	22	10
Michigan College of Mines	0	0	0	0	–	0	0	4	1	2	1	10	16
MIT	6	4	2	0	.667	27	22	8	5	2	1	42	31
New York State	–	–	–	–	–	–	–	–	–	–	–	–	–
Notre Dame	0	0	0	0	–	0	0	2	2	0	0	10	5
Pennsylvania	3	0	2	1	.167	3	13	7	1	5	1	15	35
Princeton	6	1	5	0	.167	13	31	10	2	8	0	22	53
Rensselaer	4	1	3	0	.250	24	8	4	1	3	0	24	8
Tufts	4	0	4	0	.000	4	16	4	0	4	0	4	16
Williams	5	3	2	0	.600	10	9	5	3	2	0	10	9
Yale	4	2	2	0	.500	14	9	9	4	5	0	36	38
YMCA College	–	–	–	–	–	–	–	–	–	–	–	–	–

== Schedule and results ==
Date	Opponent	Site	Result	Record
Regular Season
January 14	vs. St. Dominique's*	Lake Andrews Rink • Lewiston, Maine	W 3–0	1–0–0
January 21	Bowdoin*	Lake Andrews Rink • Lewiston, Maine	W 5–1	2–0–0
January 24	at Portland Hockey Club*	Portland, Maine	L 1–3 ^{3OT}	2–1–0
January 28	Bowdoin*	Lake Andrews Rink • Lewiston, Maine	W 9–4	3–1–0
January 31	at Portland Hockey Club*	Lake Andrews Rink • Lewiston, Maine	L 2–6	3–2–0
February 3	Nibrocks*	Lake Andrews Rink • Lewiston, Maine	L 0–4	3–3–0
February 26	Bowdoin*	Lake Andrews Rink • Lewiston, Maine	W 1–0	4–3–0
February 27	Bowdoin*	Lake Andrews Rink • Lewiston, Maine	L 0–1	4–4–0
*Non-conference game.

== Scoring statistics ==
Name	Position	Games	Goals
Romeo Provost	R/LW/RW	7	9
Norman Sauvage	P/CP/RW	4	4
Felix Cutler	C/R/RW/CP	7	4
Eddie Roberts	C/R/LW/RW	7	2
Ralph Burns	CP/C/R/LW/RW	8	2
Chester Cleaves	Substitute	1	0
Carl Belmore	C	1	0
Lee Tracy	CP	1	0
Ervin Trask	LW	1	0
Romeo Bernard	RW	2	0
Ray Kendall	Substitute	2	0
Carl Rounds	RW	3	0
Don Woodward	P/CP/R/LW	7	0
John Mosher	P/CP	8	0
Jerry Buker	P/CP/RW	8	0
Carl Wiggin	G	8	0
Total			21
