= 1919–20 Notre Dame Fighting Irish men's ice hockey season =

- Conference: Independent

Record
- Overall: 2–0–0
- Road: 2–0–0

Coaches and captains
- Head coach: Paul Castner
- Captain: Paul Castner

The 1919–20 Notre Dame Fighting Irish men's ice hockey season was the 3rd season of play for the program.

== Season ==
After World War I Notre Dame resurrected its program which had existed briefly years before the war. The team was coached by team captain Paul Castner but with few available opponents they played just two games all season.

== Roster ==
No.	Nat.	Player	Class	Pos	Height	Weight	DoB	Hometown	Previous team
	(United States)	Heartly Anderson		G/D				Hancock, Michigan
	(United States)	Paul H. Castner (C)	Freshman	C			1897-02-16	Saint Paul, Minnesota
		Martin Crowes		D
	(United States)	Norm Feltes		LW				South Bend, Indiana
	(United States)	Neil Flinn		C/D				Superior, Wisconsin
	(Canada)	John Gentles		RW				Parry Sound, Ontario
	(Canada)	Anthony Gorman		RW				Edmonton, Alberta
	(United States)	David V. Hayes		G				Hartford, Connecticut
	(United States)	Fred Larson		D				Chicago, Illinois
	(United States)	Donald McDonald		D				Duluth, Minnesota
	(United States)	James Wilcox		LW				Laurium, Michigan

== Standings ==
1919–20 Collegiate ice hockey standings
	Intercollegiate							Overall					
	GP	W	L	T	PCT.	GF	GA	GP	W	L	T	GF	GA
Amherst	2	2	0	0	1.000	4	1	2	2	0	0	4	1
Army	5	3	1	1	.700	20	6	7	4	2	1	26	11
Bates	4	3	1	0	.750	15	6	8	4	4	0	21	19
Boston College	7	5	2	0	.714	41	17	8	6	2	0	45	19
Boston University	2	0	2	0	.000	2	19	2	0	2	0	2	19
Bowdoin	4	1	3	0	.250	6	15	6	2	4	0	17	28
Dartmouth	7	6	1	0	.857	26	5	10	6	4	0	30	16
Fordham	–	–	–	–	–	–	–	–	–	–	–	–	–
Hamilton	–	–	–	–	–	–	–	5	3	2	0	–	–
Harvard	7	7	0	0	1.000	44	10	13	10	3	0	65	33
Massachusetts Agricultural	5	3	2	0	.600	22	10	5	3	2	0	22	10
Michigan College of Mines	0	0	0	0	–	0	0	4	1	2	1	10	16
MIT	6	4	2	0	.667	27	22	8	5	2	1	42	31
New York State	–	–	–	–	–	–	–	–	–	–	–	–	–
Notre Dame	0	0	0	0	–	0	0	2	2	0	0	10	5
Pennsylvania	3	0	2	1	.167	3	13	7	1	5	1	15	35
Princeton	6	1	5	0	.167	13	31	10	2	8	0	22	53
Rensselaer	4	1	3	0	.250	24	8	4	1	3	0	24	8
Tufts	4	0	4	0	.000	4	16	4	0	4	0	4	16
Williams	5	3	2	0	.600	10	9	5	3	2	0	10	9
Yale	4	2	2	0	.500	14	9	9	4	5	0	36	38
YMCA College	–	–	–	–	–	–	–	–	–	–	–	–	–

== Schedule and results ==
Date	Opponent	Site	Result	Record
Regular Season
January 7	at Culver Military Academy*	Lake Maxinkuckee • Culver, Indiana	W 6–2	1–0–0
January 27	at Culver Military Academy*	Lake Maxinkuckee • Culver, Indiana	W 4–3	2–0–0
*Non-conference game.
