= 1919–20 Boston University men's ice hockey season =

- Conference: Independent

Record
- Overall: 0–2–0
- Neutral: 0–2–0

Coaches and captains
- Head coach: Harold Stuart
- Captain: Edward Hersey

The 1919–20 Boston University men's ice hockey season was the 2nd season of play for the program.

== Season ==
After suspending play in the wake of the fire that burned down the original Boston Arena, BU returned to the ice in 1919. Unfortunately, because the team was unable to come to an arrangement with the operators of the new Arena, they were forced to find other venues. The first game for the team was arranged on the fly as Massachusetts Agricultural was originally slated to play MIT. Though BU stepped in, the team had only been on the ice for one practice and were outclassed to such a great degree that the reporters didn't bother giving an account of the game. A few weeks later the team met Boston College and, once more, were completely out of their depth. By the end of the first half, BC was ahead by 7 goals. The Eagles essentially took the second half off but still added to their total.

After the two embarrassing losses, the team was again mothballed until the school could find a home for the program.

Note: Boston University's athletic programs weren't known as the 'Terriers' until 1922.

== Roster ==
No.	Nat.	Player	Class	Pos	Height	Weight	DoB	Hometown	Previous team
		Andrew Evers
		Charles Goodrich
		Edward Hersey (C)
		John Mutty
		Clifford Pinkham
		Philip Richardson
		Henry Roeske
		Robert Sears
		Hazen Spinney
		Warren Sullivan

== Standings ==
1919–20 Collegiate ice hockey standings
	Intercollegiate							Overall					
	GP	W	L	T	PCT.	GF	GA	GP	W	L	T	GF	GA
Amherst	2	2	0	0	1.000	4	1	2	2	0	0	4	1
Army	5	3	1	1	.700	20	6	7	4	2	1	26	11
Bates	4	3	1	0	.750	15	6	8	4	4	0	21	19
Boston College	7	5	2	0	.714	41	17	8	6	2	0	45	19
Boston University	2	0	2	0	.000	2	19	2	0	2	0	2	19
Bowdoin	4	1	3	0	.250	6	15	6	2	4	0	17	28
Dartmouth	7	6	1	0	.857	26	5	10	6	4	0	30	16
Fordham	–	–	–	–	–	–	–	–	–	–	–	–	–
Hamilton	–	–	–	–	–	–	–	5	3	2	0	–	–
Harvard	7	7	0	0	1.000	44	10	13	10	3	0	65	33
Massachusetts Agricultural	5	3	2	0	.600	22	10	5	3	2	0	22	10
Michigan College of Mines	0	0	0	0	–	0	0	4	1	2	1	10	16
MIT	6	4	2	0	.667	27	22	8	5	2	1	42	31
New York State	–	–	–	–	–	–	–	–	–	–	–	–	–
Notre Dame	0	0	0	0	–	0	0	2	2	0	0	10	5
Pennsylvania	3	0	2	1	.167	3	13	7	1	5	1	15	35
Princeton	6	1	5	0	.167	13	31	10	2	8	0	22	53
Rensselaer	4	1	3	0	.250	24	8	4	1	3	0	24	8
Tufts	4	0	4	0	.000	4	16	4	0	4	0	4	16
Williams	5	3	2	0	.600	10	9	5	3	2	0	10	9
Yale	4	2	2	0	.500	14	9	9	4	5	0	36	38
YMCA College	–	–	–	–	–	–	–	–	–	–	–	–	–

== Schedule and results ==
Date	Opponent	Site	Result	Record
Regular Season
January 16	vs. Massachusetts Agricultural*	Pavilion Ice Rink • Cambridge, Massachusetts	L 2–10	0–1–0
February 4	vs. Boston College*	Alumni Rink • Newton, Massachusetts	L 0–9	0–2–0
*Non-conference game.

== Scoring statistics ==
Name	Position	Games	Goals
John Mutty		1	1
Warren Sullivan		1	1
Andrew Evers		1	0
Philip Richardson		1	0
Robert Sears		1	0
Charles Goodrich		2	0
Edward Hersey		2	0
Clifford Pinkham		2	0
Henry Roeske		2	0
Hazen Spinney		2	0
Total			2
