= Ed Chapleau =

Canadian ice hockey player

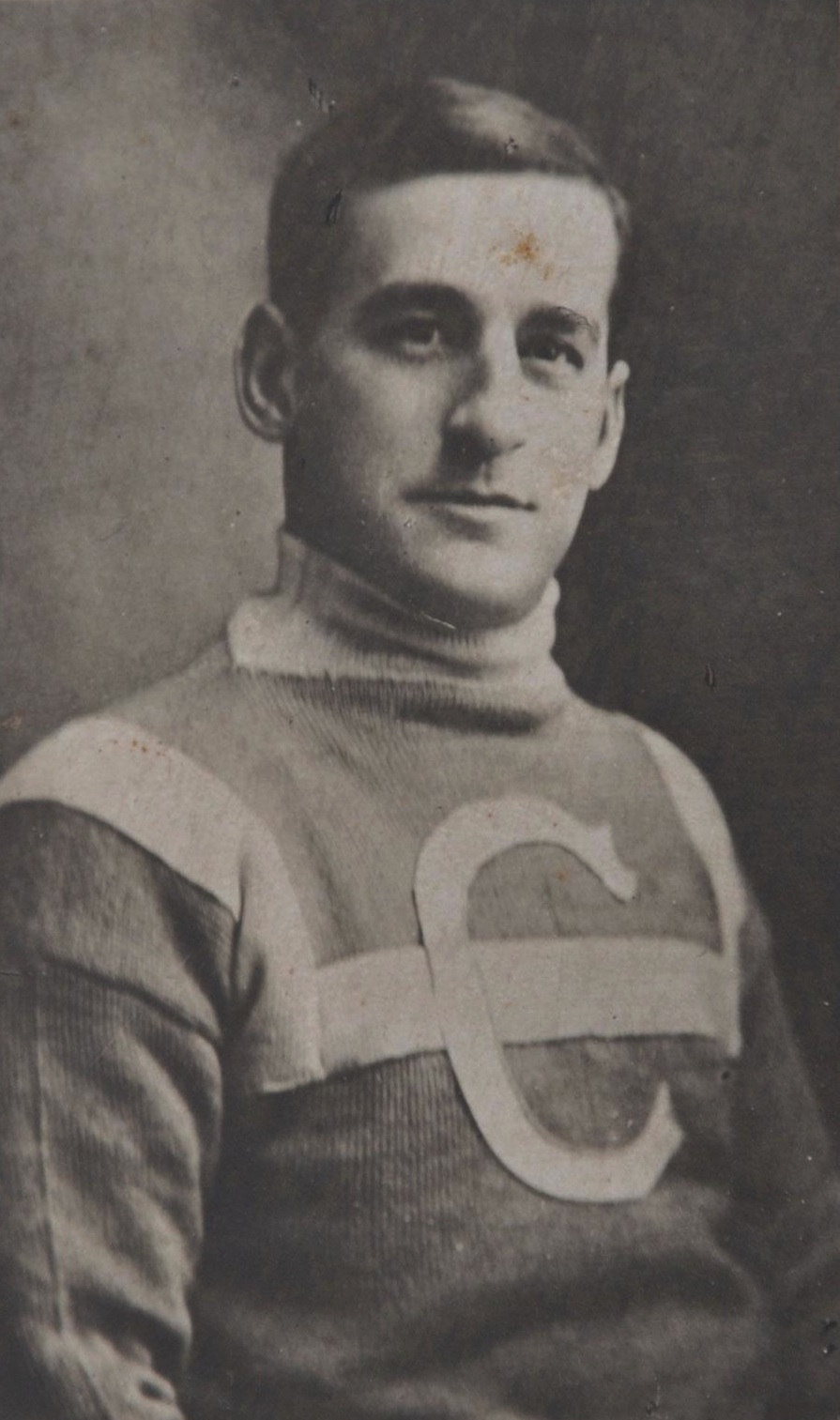
- Born: March 1, 1884; Montreal, Quebec, Canada
- Died: November 10, 1932 (aged 48); Montreal, Quebec, Canada
- Position: Rover
- Played for: Montreal Canadiens
- Playing career: 1903–1911

Joseph Edgard Paschal Chapleau (March 1, 1884 – November 10, 1932) was a professional ice hockey player. He played with the Montreal Canadiens of the National Hockey Association.
