= 1919–20 MIT Engineers men's ice hockey season =

- Conference: Independent
- Home ice: Pavilion Rink

Record
- Overall: 5–2–1
- Home: 2–2–1
- Road: 2–0–0
- Neutral: 1–0–0

Coaches and captains
- Captain: Daniel MacNeil

The 1919–20 MIT Engineers men's ice hockey season was the 19th season of play for the program.

== Season ==
The team did not have a head coach but Rollin Officer served as team manager.

Note: Massachusetts Institute of Technology athletics were referred to as 'Engineers' or 'Techmen' during the first two decades of the 20th century. By 1920 all sports programs had adopted the Engineer moniker.

== Roster ==
No.	Nat.	Player	Class	Pos	Height	Weight	DoB	Hometown	Previous team
	(United States)	William A. Cauldwell	Sophomore	D			1898-07-18	Arkansas
		Clarence Cochrane	Senior	RW
	(United States)	Edwin F. Delaney	Junior	LW			1898-11-05	Brookline, Massachusetts
	(United States)	John N. DuVernet	Sophomore	D			1897-07-08	Jamaica Plain, Massachusetts	West Roxbury High School
	(Canada)	Daniel M. MacNeil	Junior	C			1895-01-31		St. Francis Xavier College
	(United States)	Theodore A. Schwamb	Sophomore	G			1898-12-18	Arlington, Massachusetts	Chauney High School
	(United States)	Carl E. Thomas	Junior	RW			1897-10-21	Waverley, Massachusetts	Belmont High School
		Howard J. Williams	Graduate	LW
	(United States)	Hubert L. Williams	Sophomore	C			1900-10-21	Richmond, Virginia	University of Virginia

== Standings ==
1919–20 Collegiate ice hockey standings
	Intercollegiate							Overall					
	GP	W	L	T	PCT.	GF	GA	GP	W	L	T	GF	GA
Amherst	2	2	0	0	1.000	4	1	2	2	0	0	4	1
Army	5	3	1	1	.700	20	6	7	4	2	1	26	11
Bates	4	3	1	0	.750	15	6	8	4	4	0	21	19
Boston College	7	5	2	0	.714	41	17	8	6	2	0	45	19
Boston University	2	0	2	0	.000	2	19	2	0	2	0	2	19
Bowdoin	4	1	3	0	.250	6	15	6	2	4	0	17	28
Dartmouth	7	6	1	0	.857	26	5	10	6	4	0	30	16
Fordham	–	–	–	–	–	–	–	–	–	–	–	–	–
Hamilton	–	–	–	–	–	–	–	5	3	2	0	–	–
Harvard	7	7	0	0	1.000	44	10	13	10	3	0	65	33
Massachusetts Agricultural	5	3	2	0	.600	22	10	5	3	2	0	22	10
Michigan College of Mines	0	0	0	0	–	0	0	4	1	2	1	10	16
MIT	6	4	2	0	.667	27	22	8	5	2	1	42	31
New York State	–	–	–	–	–	–	–	–	–	–	–	–	–
Notre Dame	0	0	0	0	–	0	0	2	2	0	0	10	5
Pennsylvania	3	0	2	1	.167	3	13	7	1	5	1	15	35
Princeton	6	1	5	0	.167	13	31	10	2	8	0	22	53
Rensselaer	4	1	3	0	.250	24	8	4	1	3	0	24	8
Tufts	4	0	4	0	.000	4	16	4	0	4	0	4	16
Williams	5	3	2	0	.600	10	9	5	3	2	0	10	9
Yale	4	2	2	0	.500	14	9	9	4	5	0	36	38
YMCA College	–	–	–	–	–	–	–	–	–	–	–	–	–

== Schedule and results ==
Date	Opponent	Site	Result	Record
Regular Season
January 9	Tufts*	Pavilion Rink • Cambridge, Massachusetts	W 4–2	1–0–0
January 27	vs. Boston College*	Roslindale, Massachusetts	W 6–4	2–0–0
January 30	at YMCA College*	Springfield, Massachusetts	W 10–2	3–0–0
February 4	vs. Harvard*	Pavilion Rink • Cambridge, Massachusetts	L 0–8	3–1–0
February 6	Boston College*	Pavilion Rink • Cambridge, Massachusetts	L 4–5	3–2–0
February 11	Yankee Division Club*	Pavilion Rink • Cambridge, Massachusetts	T 7–7 ^{4OT}	3–2–1
February 14	at Williams*	Cole Field House Pond • Williamstown, Massachusetts	W 3–1	4–2–1
February 18	Yankee Division Club*	Pavilion Rink • Cambridge, Massachusetts	W 8–2	5–2–1
*Non-conference game.
