= 1919–20 Williams Ephs men's ice hockey season =

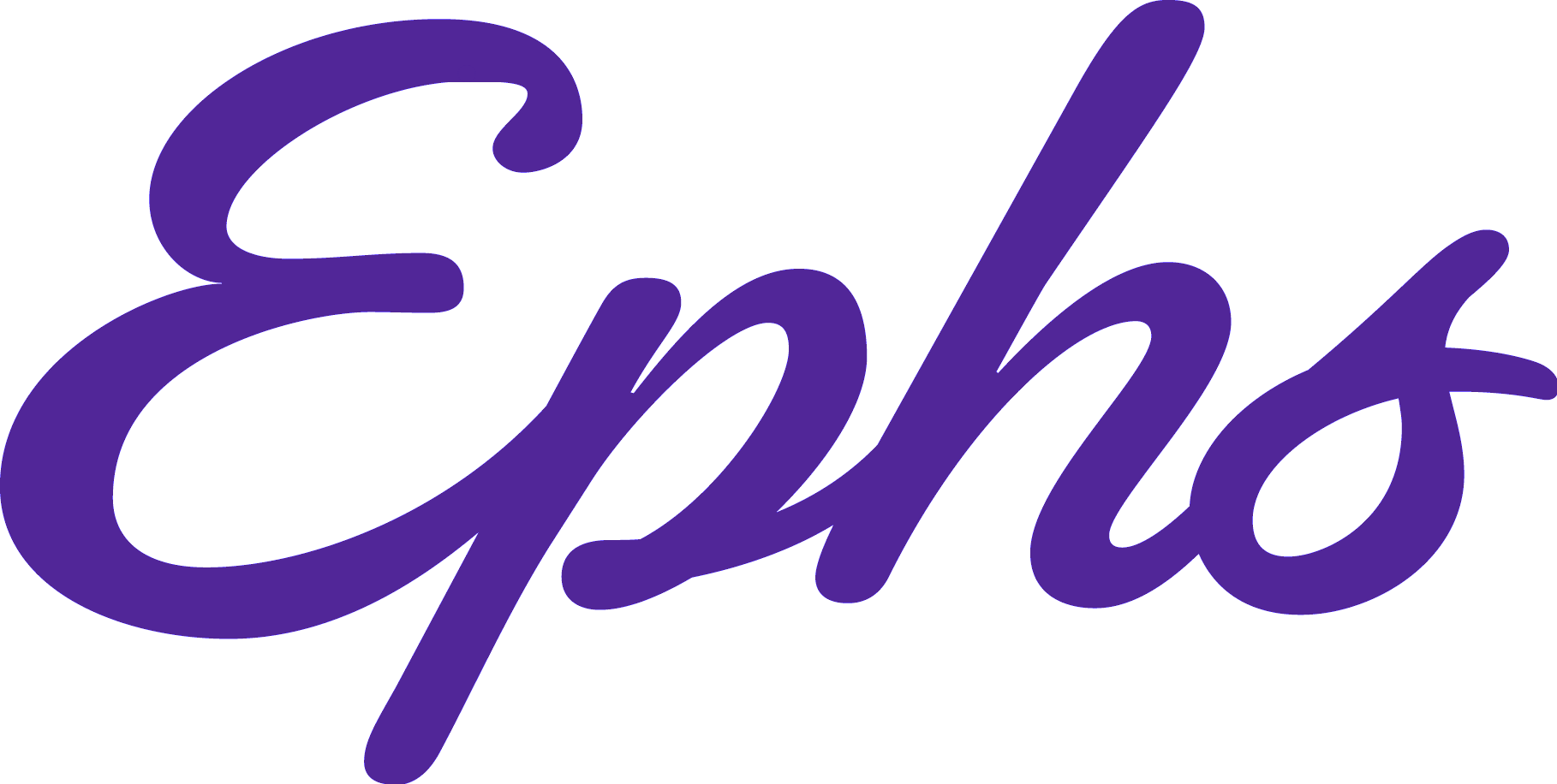
- Conference: Independent
- Home ice: Cole Field House Pond

Record
- Overall: 3–2–0
- Home: 2–1–0
- Road: 1–1–0

Coaches and captains

The 1919–20 Williams Ephs men's ice hockey season was the 17th season of play for the program.

== Roster ==
No.	Nat.	Player	Class	Pos	Height	Weight	DoB	Hometown	Previous team

== Standings ==
1919–20 Collegiate ice hockey standings
	Intercollegiate							Overall					
	GP	W	L	T	PCT.	GF	GA	GP	W	L	T	GF	GA
Amherst	2	2	0	0	1.000	4	1	2	2	0	0	4	1
Army	5	3	1	1	.700	20	6	7	4	2	1	26	11
Bates	4	3	1	0	.750	15	6	8	4	4	0	21	19
Boston College	7	5	2	0	.714	41	17	8	6	2	0	45	19
Boston University	2	0	2	0	.000	2	19	2	0	2	0	2	19
Bowdoin	4	1	3	0	.250	6	15	6	2	4	0	17	28
Dartmouth	7	6	1	0	.857	26	5	10	6	4	0	30	16
Fordham	–	–	–	–	–	–	–	–	–	–	–	–	–
Hamilton	–	–	–	–	–	–	–	5	3	2	0	–	–
Harvard	7	7	0	0	1.000	44	10	13	10	3	0	65	33
Massachusetts Agricultural	5	3	2	0	.600	22	10	5	3	2	0	22	10
Michigan College of Mines	0	0	0	0	–	0	0	4	1	2	1	10	16
MIT	6	4	2	0	.667	27	22	8	5	2	1	42	31
New York State	–	–	–	–	–	–	–	–	–	–	–	–	–
Notre Dame	0	0	0	0	–	0	0	2	2	0	0	10	5
Pennsylvania	3	0	2	1	.167	3	13	7	1	5	1	15	35
Princeton	6	1	5	0	.167	13	31	10	2	8	0	22	53
Rensselaer	4	1	3	0	.250	24	8	4	1	3	0	24	8
Tufts	4	0	4	0	.000	4	16	4	0	4	0	4	16
Williams	5	3	2	0	.600	10	9	5	3	2	0	10	9
Yale	4	2	2	0	.500	14	9	9	4	5	0	36	38
YMCA College	–	–	–	–	–	–	–	–	–	–	–	–	–

== Schedule and results ==
Date	Opponent	Site	Result	Record
Regular Season
January 10	YMCA College*	Cole Field House Pond • Williamstown, Massachusetts	W 4–3	1–0–0
January 17	Hamilton*	Cole Field House Pond • Williamstown, Massachusetts	W 4–2	2–0–0
February 14	MIT*	Cole Field House Pond • Williamstown, Massachusetts	L 1–3	2–1–0
February 21	at Army*	Stuart Rink • West Point, New York	L 0–1	2–2–0
February 28	at Hamilton*	Clinton, New York	W 1–0	3–2–0
*Non-conference game.
