= 1919–20 Boston College men's ice hockey season =

- Conference: Independent
- Home ice: Pavilion Rink

Record
- Overall: 6–2–0
- Home: 2–1–0
- Road: 2–0–0
- Neutral: 2–1–0

Coaches and captains
- Head coach: Walter Falvey
- Captain: Frank Morrissey

The 1919–20 Boston College men's ice hockey season was the 3rd season of play for the program.

== Season ==
With the vast majority of interested colleges ready to go for the 1919–20 season, Boston College was finally able to play a full schedule of games. While that amounted to just 7 games that was still more than they had played over the previous two seasons combined. After beginning with a win over the Yankee Division Club team, BC dropped a three overtime game to Massachusetts Agricultural College, one of the top second-tier schools. Ten days later the team lost again, this time to MIT after the rematch with MAC had to be scrubbed.

The losses lit a fire under the players who ran roughshod over their next three opponents, posting three consecutive shutouts. Even when they did finally surrender a goal, BC refused to lose for the remainder of the season and finished with a 6–2 record. Despite the success, former team captain Walter Falvey stepped down as head coach after the season.

Note: Boston College's athletic programs weren't known as the 'Eagles' until 1920.

== Roster ==
No.	Nat.	Player	Class	Pos	Height	Weight	DoB	Hometown	Previous team
	(United States)	John Curry	Freshman					Cambridge, Massachusetts
	(United States)	Edmund Garrity	Freshman					Belmont, Massachusetts
	(United States)	Bernard Healy						Brookline, Massachusetts
	(United States)	S. Leo Hughes	Sophomore					Newton, Massachusetts
	(United States)	Don McCluskey						Dorchester, Massachusetts
	(United States)	Frank Morrissey (C)	Junior				1899-03-11	Medford, Massachusetts
	(United States)	Leonard Morrissey	Freshman					Medford, Massachusetts
	(United States)	Edmund O'Brien		G				Cambridge, Massachusetts
	(United States)	Luke Urban	Junior	G			1898-03-22	Fall River, Massachusetts

== Standings ==
1919–20 Collegiate ice hockey standings
	Intercollegiate							Overall					
	GP	W	L	T	PCT.	GF	GA	GP	W	L	T	GF	GA
Amherst	2	2	0	0	1.000	4	1	2	2	0	0	4	1
Army	5	3	1	1	.700	20	6	7	4	2	1	26	11
Bates	4	3	1	0	.750	15	6	8	4	4	0	21	19
Boston College	7	5	2	0	.714	41	17	8	6	2	0	45	19
Boston University	2	0	2	0	.000	2	19	2	0	2	0	2	19
Bowdoin	4	1	3	0	.250	6	15	6	2	4	0	17	28
Dartmouth	7	6	1	0	.857	26	5	10	6	4	0	30	16
Fordham	–	–	–	–	–	–	–	–	–	–	–	–	–
Hamilton	–	–	–	–	–	–	–	5	3	2	0	–	–
Harvard	7	7	0	0	1.000	44	10	13	10	3	0	65	33
Massachusetts Agricultural	5	3	2	0	.600	22	10	5	3	2	0	22	10
Michigan College of Mines	0	0	0	0	–	0	0	4	1	2	1	10	16
MIT	6	4	2	0	.667	27	22	8	5	2	1	42	31
New York State	–	–	–	–	–	–	–	–	–	–	–	–	–
Notre Dame	0	0	0	0	–	0	0	2	2	0	0	10	5
Pennsylvania	3	0	2	1	.167	3	13	7	1	5	1	15	35
Princeton	6	1	5	0	.167	13	31	10	2	8	0	22	53
Rensselaer	4	1	3	0	.250	24	8	4	1	3	0	24	8
Tufts	4	0	4	0	.000	4	16	4	0	4	0	4	16
Williams	5	3	2	0	.600	10	9	5	3	2	0	10	9
Yale	4	2	2	0	.500	14	9	9	4	5	0	36	38
YMCA College	–	–	–	–	–	–	–	–	–	–	–	–	–

== Schedule and results ==
Date	Opponent	Site	Result	Record
Regular Season
January 7	Yankee Division Club*	Pavilion Rink • Cambridge, Massachusetts	W 4–2	1–0–0
January 17	Massachusetts Agricultural*	Boston, Massachusetts	L 4–5 ^{3OT}	1–1–0
January 27	vs. MIT*	Roslindale, Massachusetts	L 4–6	1–2–0
January 31	at Army*	Stuart Rink • West Point, New York	W 5–0	2–2–0
February 2	at Fordham*	181st Street Rink • Manhattan, New York	W 10–0	3–2–0
February 4	vs. Boston University*	Alumni Rink • Newton, Massachusetts	W 9–0	4–2–0
February 6	vs. MIT*	Pavilion Rink • Cambridge, Massachusetts	W 5–4	5–2–0
February 18	Tufts*	Pavilion Rink • Cambridge, Massachusetts	W 4–2	6–2–0
*Non-conference game.
