= 1919–20 Michigan College of Mines Huskies men's ice hockey season =

- Conference: Independent

Record
- Overall: 1–2–1
- Road: 1–2–1

Coaches and captains
- Head coach: E. R. Lovel
- Captain: None

The 1919–20 Michigan College of Mines Huskies men's ice hockey season was the inaugural season of play for the program.

== Season ==
After World War I college hockey began to expand west from its heartland in New England. Michigan College of Mines was one of two schools in the midwest to begin play in the 1919–20 season (the other being Notre Dame). Due to the lack of collegiate opponents, MCM didn't play any other colleges during their first season, nor did they play any home games as the school did not own or lease any of the local rinks.

== Roster ==
No.	Nat.	Player	Class	Pos	Height	Weight	DoB	Hometown	Previous team

== Standings ==
1919–20 Collegiate ice hockey standings
	Intercollegiate							Overall					
	GP	W	L	T	PCT.	GF	GA	GP	W	L	T	GF	GA
Amherst	2	2	0	0	1.000	4	1	2	2	0	0	4	1
Army	5	3	1	1	.700	20	6	7	4	2	1	26	11
Bates	4	3	1	0	.750	15	6	8	4	4	0	21	19
Boston College	7	5	2	0	.714	41	17	8	6	2	0	45	19
Boston University	2	0	2	0	.000	2	19	2	0	2	0	2	19
Bowdoin	4	1	3	0	.250	6	15	6	2	4	0	17	28
Dartmouth	7	6	1	0	.857	26	5	10	6	4	0	30	16
Fordham	–	–	–	–	–	–	–	–	–	–	–	–	–
Hamilton	–	–	–	–	–	–	–	5	3	2	0	–	–
Harvard	7	7	0	0	1.000	44	10	13	10	3	0	65	33
Massachusetts Agricultural	5	3	2	0	.600	22	10	5	3	2	0	22	10
Michigan College of Mines	0	0	0	0	–	0	0	4	1	2	1	10	16
MIT	6	4	2	0	.667	27	22	8	5	2	1	42	31
New York State	–	–	–	–	–	–	–	–	–	–	–	–	–
Notre Dame	0	0	0	0	–	0	0	2	2	0	0	10	5
Pennsylvania	3	0	2	1	.167	3	13	7	1	5	1	15	35
Princeton	6	1	5	0	.167	13	31	10	2	8	0	22	53
Rensselaer	4	1	3	0	.250	24	8	4	1	3	0	24	8
Tufts	4	0	4	0	.000	4	16	4	0	4	0	4	16
Williams	5	3	2	0	.600	10	9	5	3	2	0	10	9
Yale	4	2	2	0	.500	14	9	9	4	5	0	36	38
YMCA College	–	–	–	–	–	–	–	–	–	–	–	–	–

== Schedule and results ==
Date	Opponent	Site	Result	Record
Regular Season
January 20	at Ripley Standard*		W 2–0	1–0–0
January 27	at Chassell*	Chassell, Michigan	T 3–3	1–0–1
February 3	at Houghton Legion*	Houghton, Michigan	L 3–4	1–1–1
February 5	at Calumet Seniors*	Calumet, Michigan	L 2–9	1–2–1
*Non-conference game.
