= 1919–20 United States collegiate men's ice hockey season =

- Duration: December 1919– March 1920
- Collegiate champion: Harvard

The 1919–20 United States collegiate men's ice hockey season was the 26th season of collegiate ice hockey.

== Regular season ==
=== Standings ===
1919–20 Collegiate ice hockey standings
| | Intercollegiate | | | | | | | Overall | | | | | |
| | GP | W | L | T | PCT. | GF | GA | GP | W | L | T | GF | GA |
|---|---|---|---|---|---|---|---|---|---|---|---|---|---|
| Amherst | 2 | 2 | 0 | 0 | 1.000 | 4 | 1 | 2 | 2 | 0 | 0 | 4 | 1 |
| Army | 5 | 3 | 1 | 1 | .700 | 20 | 6 | 7 | 4 | 2 | 1 | 26 | 11 |
| Bates | 4 | 3 | 1 | 0 | .750 | 15 | 6 | 8 | 4 | 4 | 0 | 21 | 19 |
| Boston College | 7 | 5 | 2 | 0 | .714 | 41 | 17 | 8 | 6 | 2 | 0 | 45 | 19 |
| Boston University | 2 | 0 | 2 | 0 | .000 | 2 | 19 | 2 | 0 | 2 | 0 | 2 | 19 |
| Bowdoin | 4 | 1 | 3 | 0 | .250 | 6 | 15 | 6 | 2 | 4 | 0 | 17 | 28 |
| Dartmouth | 7 | 6 | 1 | 0 | .857 | 26 | 5 | 10 | 6 | 4 | 0 | 30 | 16 |
| Fordham | – | – | – | – | – | – | – | – | – | – | – | – | – |
| Hamilton | – | – | – | – | – | – | – | 5 | 3 | 2 | 0 | – | – |
| Harvard | 7 | 7 | 0 | 0 | 1.000 | 44 | 10 | 13 | 10 | 3 | 0 | 65 | 33 |
| Massachusetts Agricultural | 5 | 3 | 2 | 0 | .600 | 22 | 10 | 5 | 3 | 2 | 0 | 22 | 10 |
| Michigan College of Mines | 0 | 0 | 0 | 0 | – | 0 | 0 | 4 | 1 | 2 | 1 | 10 | 16 |
| MIT | 6 | 4 | 2 | 0 | .667 | 27 | 22 | 8 | 5 | 2 | 1 | 42 | 31 |
| New York State | – | – | – | – | – | – | – | – | – | – | – | – | – |
| Notre Dame | 0 | 0 | 0 | 0 | – | 0 | 0 | 2 | 2 | 0 | 0 | 10 | 5 |
| Pennsylvania | 3 | 0 | 2 | 1 | .167 | 3 | 13 | 7 | 1 | 5 | 1 | 15 | 35 |
| Princeton | 6 | 1 | 5 | 0 | .167 | 13 | 31 | 10 | 2 | 8 | 0 | 22 | 53 |
| Rensselaer | 4 | 1 | 3 | 0 | .250 | 24 | 8 | 4 | 1 | 3 | 0 | 24 | 8 |
| Tufts | 4 | 0 | 4 | 0 | .000 | 4 | 16 | 4 | 0 | 4 | 0 | 4 | 16 |
| Williams | 5 | 3 | 2 | 0 | .600 | 10 | 9 | 5 | 3 | 2 | 0 | 10 | 9 |
| Yale | 4 | 2 | 2 | 0 | .500 | 14 | 9 | 9 | 4 | 5 | 0 | 36 | 38 |
| YMCA College | – | – | – | – | – | – | – | – | – | – | – | – | – |

1919–20 Minnesota Intercollegiate Athletic Conference ice hockey standings
| | Conference | | | | | | | Overall | | | | | |
| | GP | W | L | T | PTS | GF | GA | GP | W | L | T | GF | GA |
|---|---|---|---|---|---|---|---|---|---|---|---|---|---|
| Carleton | – | – | – | – | – | – | – | – | – | – | – | – | – |
| Hamline | – | – | – | – | – | – | – | – | – | – | – | – | – |
| Macalester | – | – | – | – | – | – | – | – | – | – | – | – | – |
No Champion Named

1919–20 Triangular Hockey League standings
| | Conference | | | | | | | | Overall | | | | | |
| | GP | W | L | T | PTS | SW | GF | GA | GP | W | L | T | GF | GA |
|---|---|---|---|---|---|---|---|---|---|---|---|---|---|---|
| Harvard * | 4 | 4 | 0 | 0 | 1.000 | 2 | 24 | 8 | 13 | 10 | 3 | 0 | 65 | 33 |
| Yale | 4 | 2 | 2 | 0 | .500 | 1 | 14 | 9 | 9 | 4 | 5 | 0 | 36 | 38 |
| Princeton | 4 | 0 | 4 | 0 | .000 | 0 | 5 | 26 | 10 | 2 | 8 | 0 | 22 | 72 |
* indicates conference champion
