= Bob Hall (ice hockey) =

American ice hockey player

- Born: October 13, 1899 Oak Park, Illinois, United States
- Died: September 8, 1987 (aged 87)
- Height: 5 ft 8 in (173 cm)
- Weight: 165 lb (75 kg; 11 st 11 lb)
- Position: Left Wing
- Shot: Left
- Played for: New York Americans
- Playing career: 1922–1926

Robert Barlow Hall (October 13, 1899 – September 8, 1987) was an American ice hockey player who played eight games in the National Hockey League with the New York Americans during the 1925–26 season. The rest of his career, which lasted from 1922 to 1926, was mainly spent in the United States Amateur Hockey Association. Born in Oak Park, Illinois but he grew up in Duluth, Minnesota.

== Career statistics ==
=== Regular season and playoffs ===
			Regular season					Playoffs
Season	Team	League	GP	G	A	Pts	PIM	GP	G	A	Pts	PIM
1917–18	Brooklyn Crescents	AAHL	4	3	0	3	—	—	—	—	—	—
1918–19	Brooklyn Crescents	AAHL	7	11	3	14	8	—	—	—	—	—
1918–19	Brooklyn Crescents	NYSHL	4	0	3	3	2	—	—	—	—	—
1919–20	Dartmouth College	NCAA	—	—	—	—	—	—	—	—	—	—
1920–21	Dartmouth College	NCAA	—	—	—	—	—	—	—	—	—	—
1921–22	Dartmouth College	NCAA	—	—	—	—	—	—	—	—	—	—
1922–23	St. Nicholas Hockey Club	USAHA	—	2	0	2	—	—	—	—	—	—
1923–24	Dartmouth College	NCAA	—	14	0	14	—	—	—	—	—	—
1923–24	Boston Athletic Association	USAHA	1	0	0	0	—	1	0	0	0	—
1924–25	Boston Athletic Association	USAHA	8	2	0	2	—	—	—	—	—	—
1924–25	Boston Maple AA	USAHA	4	0	0	0	—	—	—	—	—	—
1924–25	Minneapolis Rockets	USAHA	6	0	0	0	0	—	—	—	—	—
1925–26	New York Athletic Club	NYSHL	—	—	—	—	—	—	—	—	—	—
1925–26	New York Americans	NHL	8	0	0	0	0	—	—	—	—	—
NHL totals			8	0	0	0	0	—	—	—	—	—
