= Dave Hayes (American football) =

American football player (1896–1956)

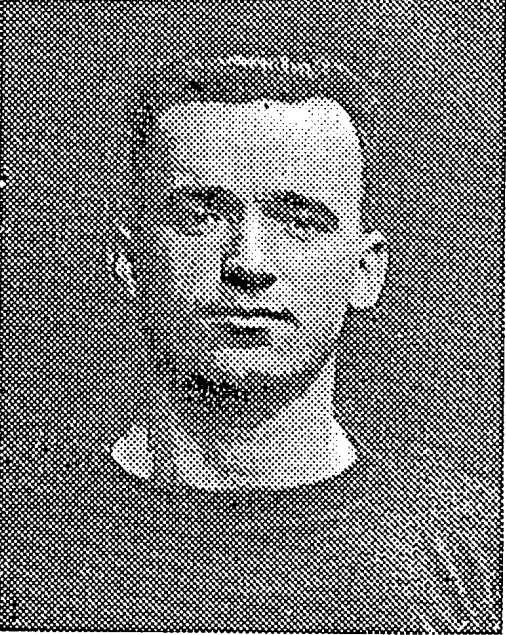
- Hayes at Notre Dame, 1920

Profile
- Position: End

Personal information
- Born: March 24, 1896
- Died: November 14, 1956 (aged 60)
- Listed height: 5 ft 8 in (1.73 m)
- Listed weight: 165 lb (75 kg)

Career information
- College: Notre Dame

Career history
- 1921: Rock Island Independents
- 1921–1922: Green Bay Packers

Career statistics
- Receiving TDs: 1
- Games played: 16
- Games started: 14

David Vincent Hayes (March 24, 1896 – November 14, 1956) was an American professional football player who played as an end for two seasons in the National Football League (NFL) with the Rock Island Independents and Green Bay Packers.
