= Philadelphia Arena =

Arena in Pennsylvania, United States

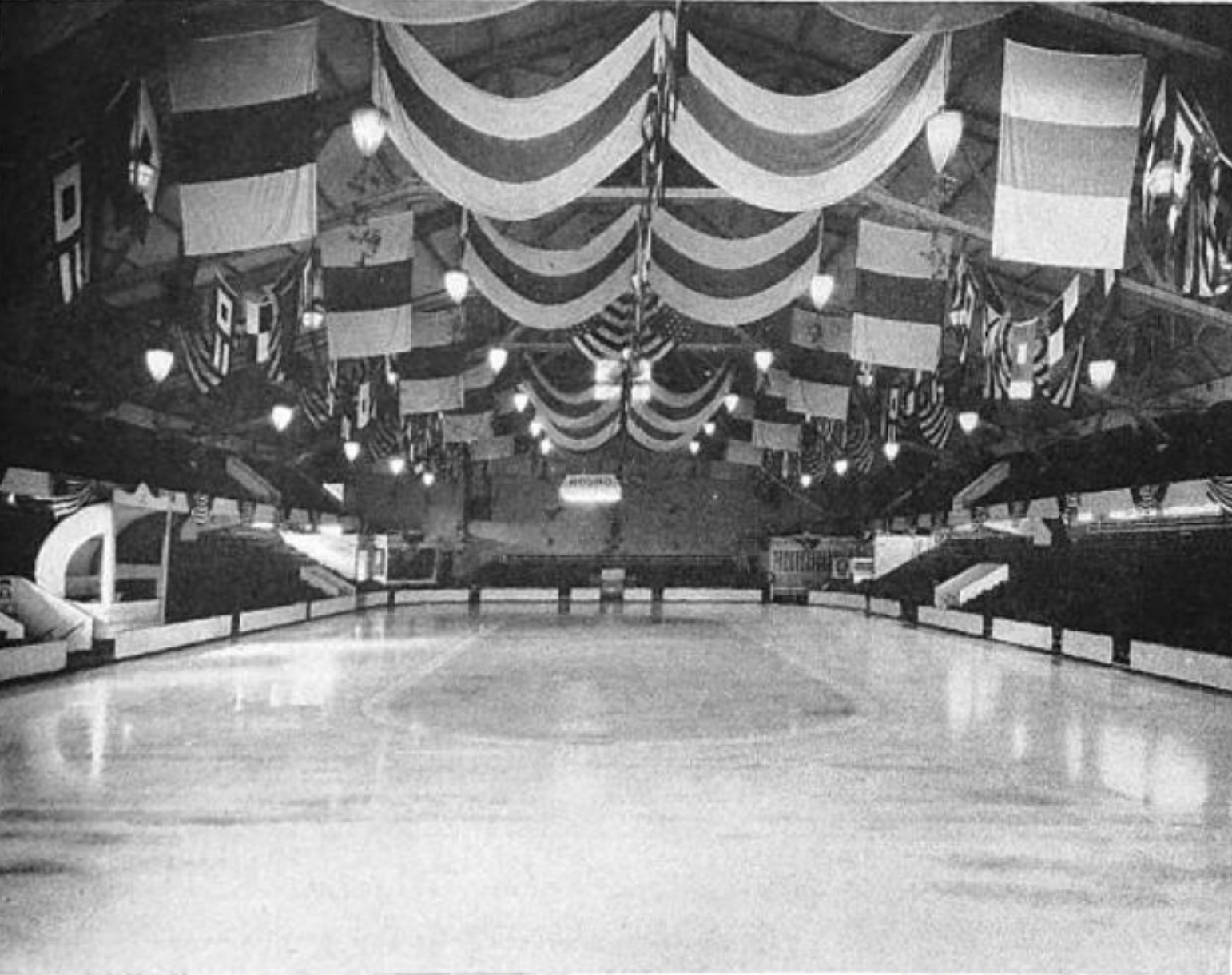
- Philadelphia Arena Ice Rink (1927)
- Interactive map of Philadelphia Arena
- Former names: Philadelphia Auditorium and Ice Palace (1920–1925); The Arena (1925–1980); Martin Luther King Jr Arena (1980–1983)
- Location: 4530 Market Street; Philadelphia, Pennsylvania
- Coordinates: 39.957959°N 75.211726°W
- Owner: George F. Pawling (1919–1922); Jules Mastbaum, Fred G. Nixon-Nirdlinger (1922–1925); Rudy Fried, Maurice Fishman (1927–1934); Triangle Publications (1947–1958); Philadelphia Arena Corp. (Peter Tyrell) (1958–1965); James Toppi Enterprises (1965–1977); Randell Wright (1977–1980); Larmark Inc (1980–1983)
- Capacity: 4,100 (permanent) (1922); 10,000 (boxing) (1922); 9,300 (1940); 5,526; 6,500 (76ers 1966)
- Public transit: SEPTA Metro: (46th Street Station); SEPTA bus: 31, 64

Construction
- Groundbreaking: November 1919
- Opened: February 14, 1920
- Closed: September 1981
- Demolished: August 24, 1983
- Builders: George F. Pawling & Company

Tenants
- Yale Bulldogs (Hockey) (1920–1921); Princeton Tigers (Hockey) (1920–1921); Penn Quakers (Hockey) (1920–1968); Quaker City (USAHA) (1921–1922); St. Nicholas (USAHA) (1921); Philadelphia Warriors (ABL) (1926–1928); Philadelphia Arrows (C-AHL) (1927–1935); Philadelphia Sphas (1928); Philadelphia Quakers (NHL) (1930–1931); Philadelphia Comets (T-SHL) (1932–1933); Philadelphia Ramblers (C-AHL/I-AHL/AHL) (1935–1941); Philadelphia Falcons (EAHL) (1942–1946; 1951); Philadelphia Rockets (AHL) (1946–1949); Philadelphia Ramblers (EHL) (1955–1964); Philadelphia Warriors (BAA/NBA) (1946–1952, part-time 1952–1962); Philadelphia Tapers (ABL) (1962, several games); Philadelphia 76ers (NBA) (1963–1967, part-time); Philadelphia Kings (CBA) (1980–1981)

The Arena was a sports arena and auditorium used mainly for sporting events located at 46th and Market Streets in West Philadelphia from 1920 until 1983. The address of the building, originally named the Philadelphia Auditorium and Ice Palace, was 4530 Market Street. It was the longtime home to ice hockey in Philadelphia until the construction of the Spectrum in 1967, and the first home of the Philadelphia Warriors basketball team. The Arena was renamed the Martin Luther King Jr. Arena in 1980, in use until its closure in 1981, and was lost to arson in 1983.

== Philadelphia Auditorium and Ice Palace ==
Philadelphia ice skating and hockey teams had used the West Park Ice Palace at 52nd and Jefferson Streets for four years before its loss to fire in March 1901. The University of Pennsylvania's George Orton introduced hockey to Philadelphia, started and captained Penn's first hockey team in 1896, started the Philadelphia Hockey League in 1897, and founded the Quaker City Hockey Club. The loss of the Ice Palace left the city without an indoor facility, limiting opportunities for teams, and to Orton, restricting the growth of the sport in the city. A municipal outdoor facility, the Winter Palace, at 39th and Market Streets featured a tent over the ice but collapsed in a winter storm. Penn's hockey team was revived in 1918, and Orton pushed the city and local businessmen to construct a new indoor ice rink.

George F. Pawling & Co. was awarded the contract to build the arena in November 1919 which included both the area at the southwest corner of 45th and Market Streets, as well as a one-story ice plant at 45th and Ludlow Streets. It was built by George F. Pawling, of George F. Pawling & Co., Engineers and Contractors and the arena owned and operated by Pawling's Philadelphia Auditorium and Ice Palace Corporation.

The ice in the new arena was 220 feet by 101 feet; the skate room could hold 3,000 pairs of skates and 4,000 coats. There were 4,000 unobstructed seats of which 1,500 were in the balcony. It was considered a premier venue at its time. The arena became the immediate home to the revived Penn hockey program, and Orton invited Princeton and Yale's hockey teams to make the arena their home rink.

The arena was to have opened on February 11, 1920, with a hockey game between the University of Pennsylvania and Princeton; however, it was postponed due to troubles with the ice plant. It opened on Saturday, February 14, 1920, with a college hockey game between Yale and Princeton Tigers; the Bulldogs won, 4–0, before a crowd of over 4,000 which would have been larger but arena construction was still not complete.

One of the first teams to make the Arena home was the Yale University men's ice hockey team. Yale did not have a suitable on-campus venue in 1920 and played home games in Philadelphia. Orton organized the Intercollegiate Ice Hockey League, and during the 1920–1921 season, Yale, Princeton, and Penn made the Arena their home ice.

The United States Amateur Hockey Association was organized in October 1920 in Philadelphia. Philadelphia had two clubs in the league, Quaker City and St. Nicholas, both of which played their home games at the Arena beginning in 1921.

The Philadelphia Ice Hockey League held its games at the Ice Palace in the early 1920s.

The Ice Palace was open to the public for ice skating.

In addition to ice skating and hockey, the Ice Palace hosted boxing matches. In February 1922, light-heavyweight champion Gene Tunney defeated Whitney Wenzel at the Ice Palace.

== The Arena (1922–1929) ==
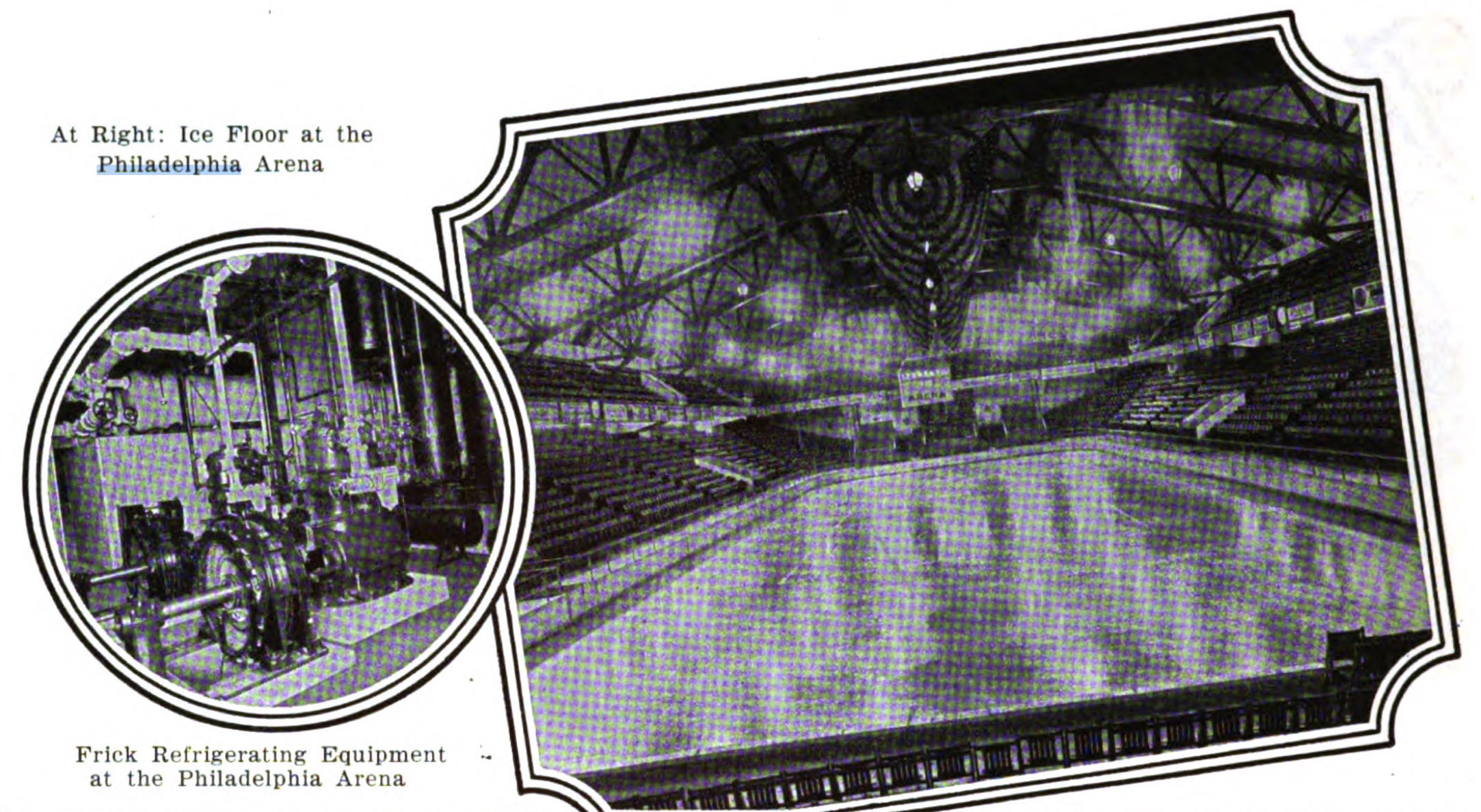
Philadelphia Arena featured by Frick Refrigerating Equipment (June 1928)

Pawling's Philadelphia Auditorium and Ice Palace Corporation was forced into bankruptcy when his original financial backers abandoned the operation. It was sold in October 1922 to Jules Mastbaum, president of the Stanley Company of America, and Fred G. Nixon-Nirdlinger. Mastbaum was local to Philadelphia and told the press at the time of the sale that it was his intention to prevent the arena from passing into New York ownership. It was reported that the Ice Palace had been a $960.000 investment for Pawling and his investors, and that the Franklin Trust Company held a $350,000 mortgage on the building and property. On January 23, 1924, the Delaware charter of the Philadelphia Auditorium & Ice Palace Corp was repealed after two years of unpaid taxes.

On January 4, 1927, the American Basketball League Philadelphia Phillies defeated the Brooklyn Celtics 31 to 29 in front of 9,000 fans at the Arena. Interest in basketball was high in Philadelphia. The University of Pennsylvania's Palestra had opened on January 1, 1927, with a capacity of 9,000 for basketball, and Convention Hall would open in 1931 also with a capacity of 9,000 for basketball. These three venues would be home to Philadelphia's top college and professional basketball teams for forty years until the opening of the Spectrum in 1967.

In 1927 the Arena was purchased by Rudy Fried and Maurice Fishman who would operate the facility until 1934, when their partnership was placed in receivership.

In early 1929, a contract was awarded Funk & Wicox, Boston to reconstruct the Arena to seat 17,000 at a cost of $1 million, however, the reconstruction would not take place, and the Arena's capacity remain as it was.

== Peter Tyrrell, Manager and Owner (1929–1965) ==
In 1929, Peter A. Tyrrell (1896–1973) joined the Arena as boxing matchmaker and subsequently became the facility's publicist. In 1934 Tyrrell was named a friendly receiver-in-equity by George Welsh, a federal judge. Tyrrell became general manager of the Arena and served in that capacity until 1958, returning the corporation to profitability and enriching the variety of public entertainment. By the time of his retirement in 1965, Tyrell had served as manager and part-owner of the Arena with which his name would become synonymous.

The arena was home to the NHL's Philadelphia Quakers in their only season, 1930–1931. Sonja Henie made her professional debut at the Arena fresh from her triumph in the 1936 Winter Olympics.

The arena was also a major venue for boxing and wrestling before the opening of the Spectrum. Throughout the history of the Arena, legends including Sugar Ray Robinson, Lew Tendler, Gene Tunney, Joe Frazier, Jack Delaney, and Primo Carnera fought there. Benny Bass drew with Cleto Locatelli on March 12, 1934, at the Arena in front of a capacity crowd. The February 1939 amateur boxing championship saw 10,000 pack the Arena for the bouts.

Tyrrell was instrumental in developing live telecasts of ice hockey, boxing, and wrestling from the Arena beginning in 1939 with Philco's experimental television station.

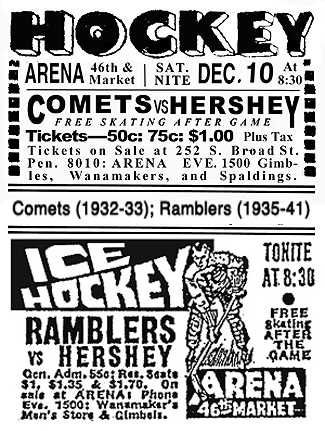
Display ads for pro hockey at the Arena (1932–41)

After being denied use of the Academy of Music, Charles A. Lindbergh gave a pro-isolationist speech at a rally held at the Arena by the America First Committee that also featured Senator David I. Walsh and Kathleen Norris on March 29, 1940. They were countered by a competing rally held in protest the previous night at Convention Hall featuring New York Mayor Fiorello La Guardia and Ambassador William Bullitt. 10,000 people crowded into the Arena to cheer Lindbergh while an additional 6,000 gathered outside to hear the speeches broadcast live.

Roy Rogers, cowboy movie star, performed in his first rodeo at the Philadelphia Arena in 1943. The Roy Rogers Rodeo played the Arena every season for more than 20 years. In 1946, when a young cowgirl died after riding a bucking bronco, her funeral was held at the venue and both Rogers and The Sons of Pioneers sang "Roundup in the Sky". After the closing prayer, the performers rode out to the cemetery on horseback.

The Arena was the home ice for several minor league hockey teams, including the Philadelphia Arrows, Philadelphia Ramblers, Philadelphia Comets, Philadelphia Falcons, Philadelphia Rockets, and the EHL Philadelphia Ramblers.

In February 1946, Leonard Peto, owner of the former-Montreal Maroons NHL franchise, announced plans to revive the franchise in Philadelphia for the 1946–1947 NHL season as the league's seventh team. Peto and his partners identified the Phillies' former ballpark site at Broad and Huntingdon for their planned 20,000 uptown arena. Arena owner Tyrell protested that the American Hockey League held territorial rights to Philadelphia, and planned himself to build a larger arena for ice hockey in Philadelphia. Peto's bid would prove unsuccessful, and the AHL admitted the Philadelphia Ramblers for the 1946–1947 season.

The same year, Tyrell was one of the members of Arena Managers Association who met at the Commodore Hotel in Manhattan to organize a new professional basketball league. Tyrell put up the $10,000 fee for the Philadelphia franchise that would play at the Arena, and founded the Philadelphia Warriors. The Warriors would play home games at the Arena from 1946 to 1952, and then play at the Arena on a part-time basis when Convention Hall was unavailable as would the Philadelphia 76ers when the Convention Hall was unavailable from 1963 until 1967 when the team moved to the Spectrum.

In 1947 the Arena was sold to Triangle Publications, along with the NBA franchise Philadelphia Warriors Basketball team. This transaction made TV station WFIL-TV (Channel 6), owned by Triangle Publications, the first joint ownership of a major professional sports team and TV station. WFIL utilized the Arena as its television studio in the late 1940s until the construction of its own building and studio next door was completed. In 1958, a group headed by Tyrrell purchased the Arena from the Walter Annenberg Foundation, to which ownership had been transferred by Triangle Publications.

The Arena was not used as much for political and other events, as those events tended to be held at Convention Hall. However, many of the city's mayoral inauguration parties were held there. The Arena was home to The Philadelphia Sports Writers Association Banquet. Evangelist Billy Sunday spoke there. The Arena was rented by the Nation of Islam and Elijah Muhammad spoke on "Separation or Death" on September 29, 1963.

== James Toppi (1965–1977) ==
At the time of Tyrrell's retirement in 1965, the Arena building was sold at auction to James Toppi Enterprises, a sports promotion concern, for $351,000. James Toppi was a local boxing promoter who had experience in the city's smaller sports and entertainments venues. He promised to invest in the Arena and repair the leaking floors in the balcony, fix the arena's lighting, and install additional bathrooms. Toppi booked boxing matches including local hero Joe Frazier in 1967.

The arena served as a concert venue in the 1960s. The Arena hosted the “World Series of Jazz,” featuring Miles Davis in 1967. "Didja Get Any Onya?" from the album Weasels Ripped My Flesh by Frank Zappa and the Mothers of Invention was recorded at the Arena on March 2, 1969. The Doors played two shows at the Arena on September 19, 1969.

The building fell out of popular use for basketball, hockey, major boxing matches, and concerts in the 1970s, due to the building of the Spectrum in 1967.

From 1967 to 1974, the arena was home to the Eastern Warriors, a Roller Derby team, skating every Friday and Sunday, usually to capacity. The team was also called the Philadelphia Warriors, not connected with the basketball team, and was owned by Bill Griffiths, the owner of the Los Angeles Thunderbirds and Roller Games.

Major boxing matches came to be broadcast by closed circuit television and admission charged to watch the fights at sports arenas and theaters. The Fight of the Century between Joe Frazier and Muhammad Ali attracted record audiences in March 1971. More than 17,500 fans watched it at the Spectrum, and more than 7,000 fans watched the match at the Arena, many for free after police advised that management throw open the doors to avoid a crowd crush.

Several championship wrestling matches occurred there, both for the NWA and the WWWF (including Stan Stasiak winning the WWWF championship belt in 1973, the only time until 1977 the belt ever changed hands outside of Madison Square Garden). Vincent J. McMahon filmed World Wide Wrestling Federation bouts at the Arena in the mid-1970s, filming three one-hour shows in one evening.

== Larmark Inc and MLK Arena (1977–1983) ==
Following James Toppi's passing, his wife, Edna Toppi, continued to operate and book the Arena. In 1977, she auctioned the Arena for $165,000 to Randell Wright, a formerly incarcerated auto chop-shop owner who outbid only a handful of interested parties. Wright presented minor boxing events and showed closed-circuit live boxing matches, and then sold sold the Arena in 1980 to Larmark Inc for $100,000.

Larmark Inc was owned by Mark Stewart and funded by Larry Levin as a means by which to launder the proceeds of his cocaine distribution. Stewart and Levin renamed the Arena the Martin Luther King Jr Arena and reopened on June 20, 1980, to see the Sugar Ray Leonard-Roberto Duran fight broadcast on closed-circuit television. The newly installed satellite dish malfunctioned, and customers waiting outside shattered windows and knocked down doors.

Stewart and Levin brought former Philadelphia 76ers All-Star Hal Greer into ownership, who spoke of an effort to revive West Philadelphia. Larmark Inc purchased and relocated the Continental Basketball Association's Lancaster Red Roses to the Martin Luther King Jr. Arena and renamed the team the Philadelphia Kings. They acquired the basketball floor from the Centrum in New Jersey on which the Eastern League's Cherry Hill Rookies had played, and picked up hoops discarded by Drexel University. The Kings were coached by Greer and led on the court by former NBA superstar Cazzie Russell. Attendance was low; the December 13, 1980, game against the Maine Lumberjacks was seen by 143 spectators. The franchise lasted just one season at the arena before returning to Lancaster.

By September 1981, Lavin had lost money in the Arena and directed Stewart to close the building. In October 1981, Stewart allegedly had the Arena set on fire in an effort to collect the insurance on the building and recoup the losses incurred by Lanmark Inc. The arson attempt was unsuccessful, and the Arena would remain closed until Stewart would try again in August 1983.

Responding to an alarm at a nearby apartment building on August 24, 1983, firefighters saw smoke and flames coming out of the south side of the Arena and radioed in the fire. The first alarm for the Arena was sounded at 2:46 a.m. and grew to four alarms; the entire building was destroyed in the fire. Mikal Gedis was arrested on August 26, 1983, and charged with starting three fires on August 24, including to the Arena, that led to three simultaneous four-alarm blazes requiring 400 firefighters, taxing the city's capacity. Geddis told investigators he entered the boarded-up arena to urinate and dropped a cigarette, igniting the inferno.

Writing in The Philadelphia Inquirer the day after the fire, Edgar Williams eulogized the Arena, "Warts and all ... to a lot of people who kept company with her during the first 50 years or so of her life, the Arena was a sweetheart. And when she burned yesterday, it was like watching an old romance go up in smoke. Because, you see, it was at the Arena that many of us attended our first ice hockey game, our first boxing bout, or our first rodeo. It was there that we went for dance marathons and six-day bicycle races, rocking-chair derbies and concerts, and it was there that some of us saw Elvis Presley swivel for the first time in Philadelphia."

The building stood next to what would become the WFIL TV studio that broadcast American Bandstand. As of 2025, the former site of the arena now contains a housing complex, adjacent to the former TV studio, which has become the Ron Brown Commerce Center.

== Notes ==
Preceded by first arena	Home of the Philadelphia Warriors; 1946–1962	Succeeded by Cow Palace as San Francisco Warriors
Preceded by Onondaga War Memorial as Syracuse Nationals	Home of the Philadelphia 76ers 1963–1966	Succeeded by Philadelphia Civic Center
Preceded by Duquesne Gardens as Pittsburgh Pirates	Home of the Philadelphia Quakers; 1930–1931	Succeeded by last arena
