= Rover (ice hockey) =

Former ice hockey position

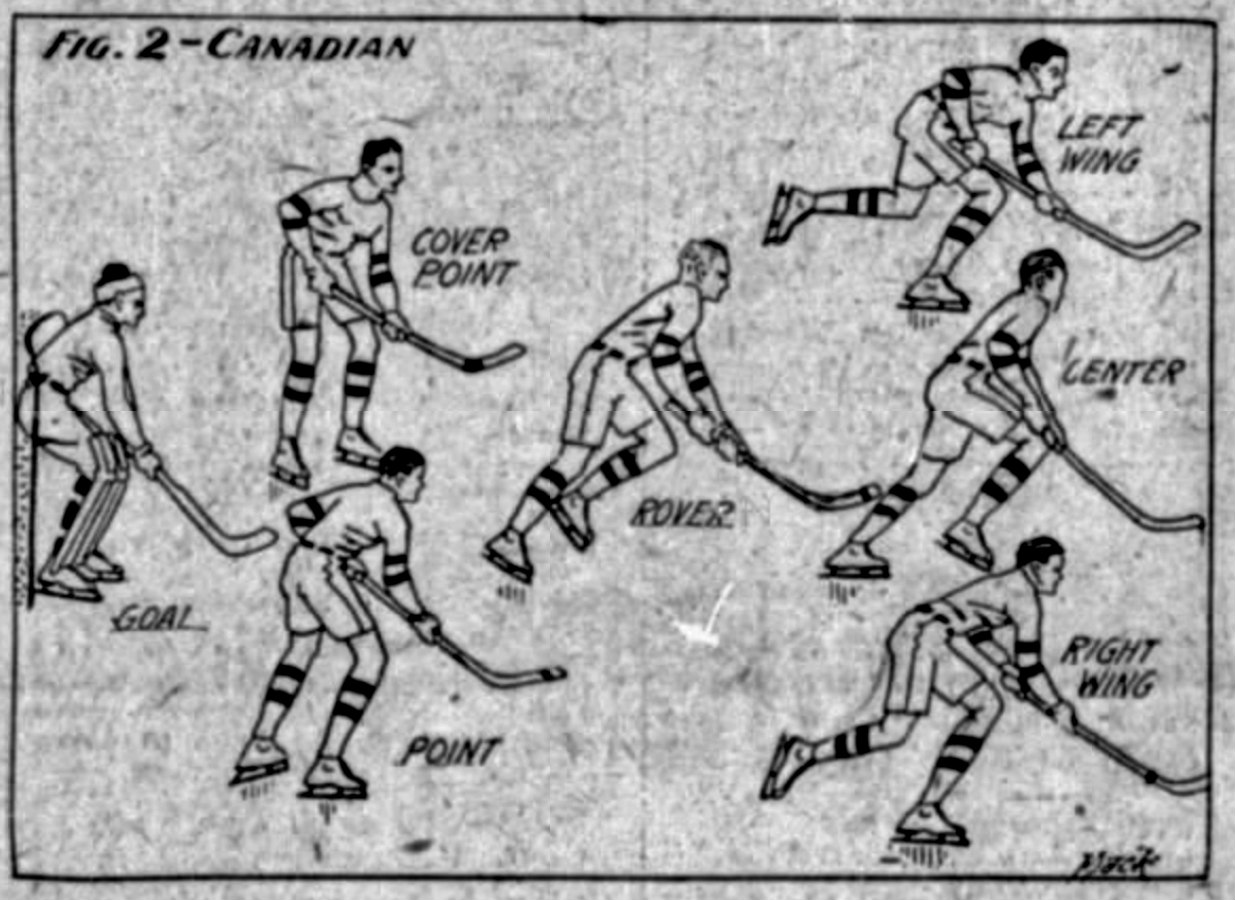
Ice hockey formation depicted in 1912, showing the rover in the middle, between the two defencemen and the center and wingers.

A rover was an ice hockey position that was phased out during the 1910s and 1920s. The rover did not have a set position, and roamed the ice at will. Use of the rover resulted in teams having seven players on the ice at once, as compared to six players under modern rules.

== History ==
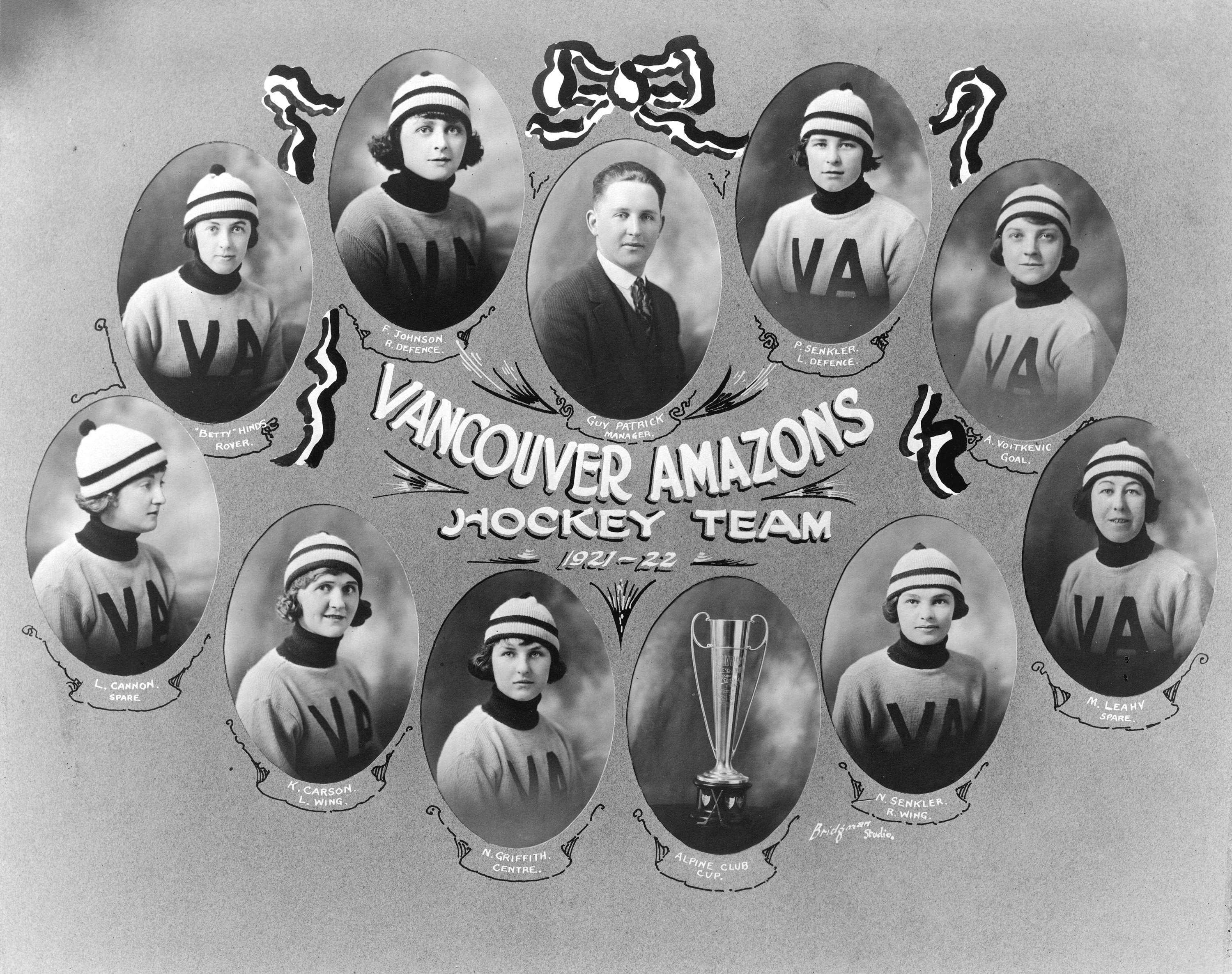
Players of the Vancouver Amazons, a women's ice hockey team of the 1920s, with one player (at upper-left) listed as playing the rover position

In the late 19th century and early 20th century, ice hockey consisted of seven positions: the goaltender, two defencemen, one rover, and three forwards. Unlike the others, who had set positions, the rover went where needed, much as a midfielder in association football might.

As the skill level of players increased, the need to have a rover decreased. Shortly after it was formed in 1910, the National Hockey Association (NHA) decided to exclude the rover. The league's successor, the National Hockey League (NHL), did the same in 1917. However, the Pacific Coast Hockey Association (PCHA), formed in 1911, kept the rover. The Western Canada Hockey League (WCHL) considered, but did not adopt, use of the rover position when it was founded in 1921. Newspapers of the era often differentiated between the two forms of the game as "seven-man hockey" and "six-man hockey".

As the NHA and later NHL did not have a rover, but the PCHA did, a compromise was made during Stanley Cup matches, which, at the time, was a challenge cup. Games would alternate between the NHA/NHL rules and PCHA versions, allowing each team an advantage and disadvantage during games.

The first Olympic ice hockey tournament, contested as part of the 1920 Summer Olympics, used a rover, but the position was eliminated for subsequent games.

In 1923, the PCHA decided to drop the rover position, as it was seen to be crowding the ice and therefore reducing the speed of play. Moreover, due to financial competition with the NHL, the added expense of a seventh starter was burdensome. The rover has remained absent from professional ice hockey, and other levels of play.

== Notable players of the position ==
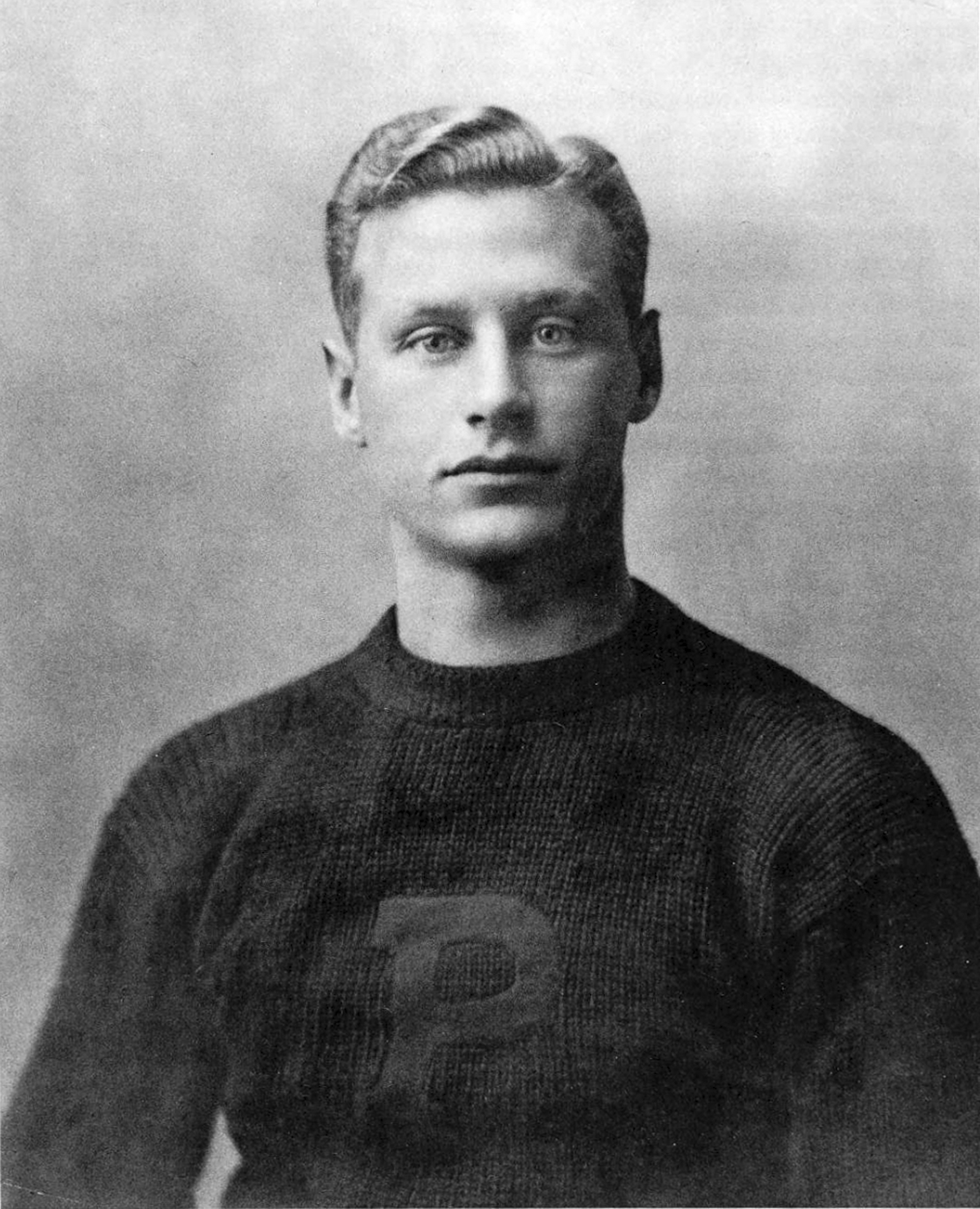
Hobey Baker

Inductees of the Hockey Hall of Fame who played the rover position (either exclusively, or along with one or more other positions) include:

- Hobey Baker
- Russell Bowie
- Silas Griffis
- Frank McGee
- Mickey MacKay
- Steamer Maxwell
- Lester Patrick
- Didier Pitre
- Frank Rankin
- Ernie Russell
- Tommy Smith
- Bruce Stuart
- Cyclone Taylor
- Harry Trihey
- Jack Walker
- Rat Westwick
- Fred Whitcroft

== Contemporary use of the term ==
The term "rover" is sometimes used to informally describe fast, rushing offensive defencemen, such as former NHL star Scott Niedermayer, as they often roam the ice creating offensive pressure instead of being simply "blueliners". Other players who have been described as modern rovers include Tyson Barrie, Brent Burns, Dustin Byfuglien, Bobby Orr, Erik Karlsson, Justin Schultz, Paul Coffey, Cale Makar and Roman Josi, due to their ability to either play forward and defense, or because of their strong puck handling skills.

The term is also sometimes used to describe the extra attacker, who roams the ice instead of assuming one of the usual positions.
