= Tufts Jumbos =

Nickname for Tufts University athletics

- University: Tufts University
- NCAA: Division III
- Conference: NESCAC (primary); NEISA; College Squash Association
- Athletic director: Ryan Pisarri
- Location: Medford, Massachusetts
- Varsity teams: 29
- Football stadium: Ellis Oval
- Basketball arena: Cousens Gymnasium
- Baseball stadium: Sol Gittleman Park
- Softball stadium: Spicer Field
- Soccer field: Bello Field
- Aquatics center: Hamilton Pool
- Lacrosse field: Bello Field
- Rowing venue: William A. Shoemaker Boathouse
- Sailing venue: Bacow Sailing Pavilion
- Tennis venue: Vouté Courts
- Outdoor track and field venue: Dussault Track & Field Complex
- Other venues: Gantcher Center, Jackson Gym, Kraft Field, Tufts Squash Center
- Colors: Tufts blue and brown
- Mascot: Jumbo
- Fight song: "Tuftonia's Day"
- Website: gotuftsjumbos.com

The Tufts Jumbos are the varsity intercollegiate athletic programs of Tufts University, in Medford, Massachusetts. The Jumbos compete at the NCAA Division III level as a member of the New England Small College Athletic Conference (NESCAC). Like all Division III schools, Tufts does not offer athletic scholarships. Coed and women's sailing are the only Division I sports at the school.

Tufts won the NACDA Directors' Cup in 2021–22 with the most successful athletic programs in NCAA Division III that year. Tufts came in second place for the Director's Cup in 2025–26.

The University mascot is named for Jumbo the elephant. P.T. Barnum donated this famous circus animal's stuffed hide to Tufts University, where it was displayed at the P.T. Barnum Hall for many years. The hide was destroyed in a fire in April 1975. The salvaged ashes of Jumbo were placed in a peanut butter jar, which continues to serve as a good luck charm for Tufts athletics teams.

== Sports sponsored ==
Men's sports	Women's sports
Baseball	Basketball
Basketball	Cross country
Cross country	Fencing
Football	Field hockey
Golf	Golf
Ice hockey	Lacrosse
Lacrosse	Rowing
Rowing	Sailing
Sailing	Soccer
Soccer	Softball
Squash	Squash
Swimming and diving	Swimming and diving
Tennis	Tennis
Track and field	Track and field
	Volleyball
† – Track and field includes both indoor and outdoor

=== Football ===
The Tufts football program is the oldest in the country. Its first game was played on June 4, 1875 against Harvard which was won by Tufts 1-0. The 1,000th game in team history was played during the 2006 season. Historians point to this Tufts versus Harvard game as the first game of college football using American football rules. The team plays at the Ellis Oval, located on the southwest corner of the campus.

=== Sailing ===
The Jumbos particularly stand out in sailing. The team competes in the New England Intercollegiate Sailing Association, and has won the Leonard M. Fowle Trophy eight times. The Jumbos also won the 2001 Dinghy National Championship, and won more championships in the 1990s than any other team. Several world and Olympic champions have been a part of the Tufts Sailing Team; among them is Tomas Hornos (class of 2010), who was world champion in 2007, and Kaitlin Storck, who was awarded the ICSA Women's College Sailor of the Year trophy in 2008. Others include Roger Altreuter in 1975, R. Stuart Johnstone in 1980, Paul Dickey in 1981, and Senet Bischoff in 1996, who all won the ICSA College Sailor of the Year trophy.

=== Other sports ===
Men's Squash maintains a top 20 Division I national ranking. Tufts University won its first NCAA-sanctioned national team championship when the men's lacrosse team defeated Salisbury in the 2010 Division III men's lacrosse final. Since then, Tufts has captured NCAA Division III National Championships in women's field hockey (2012, 2025), women's softball (three consecutive from 2013 to 2015), men's lacrosse again (2014, 2015, 2024, 2025), and men's soccer (2014, 2016, 2018, 2019, 2025). Tufts teams also reached the 2008 championship game in women's field hockey and the 2011 championship game in men's lacrosse. The men's basketball team played in the 1945 NCAA basketball tournament, involving eight teams. They lost to NYU in the first round.

== Facilities ==
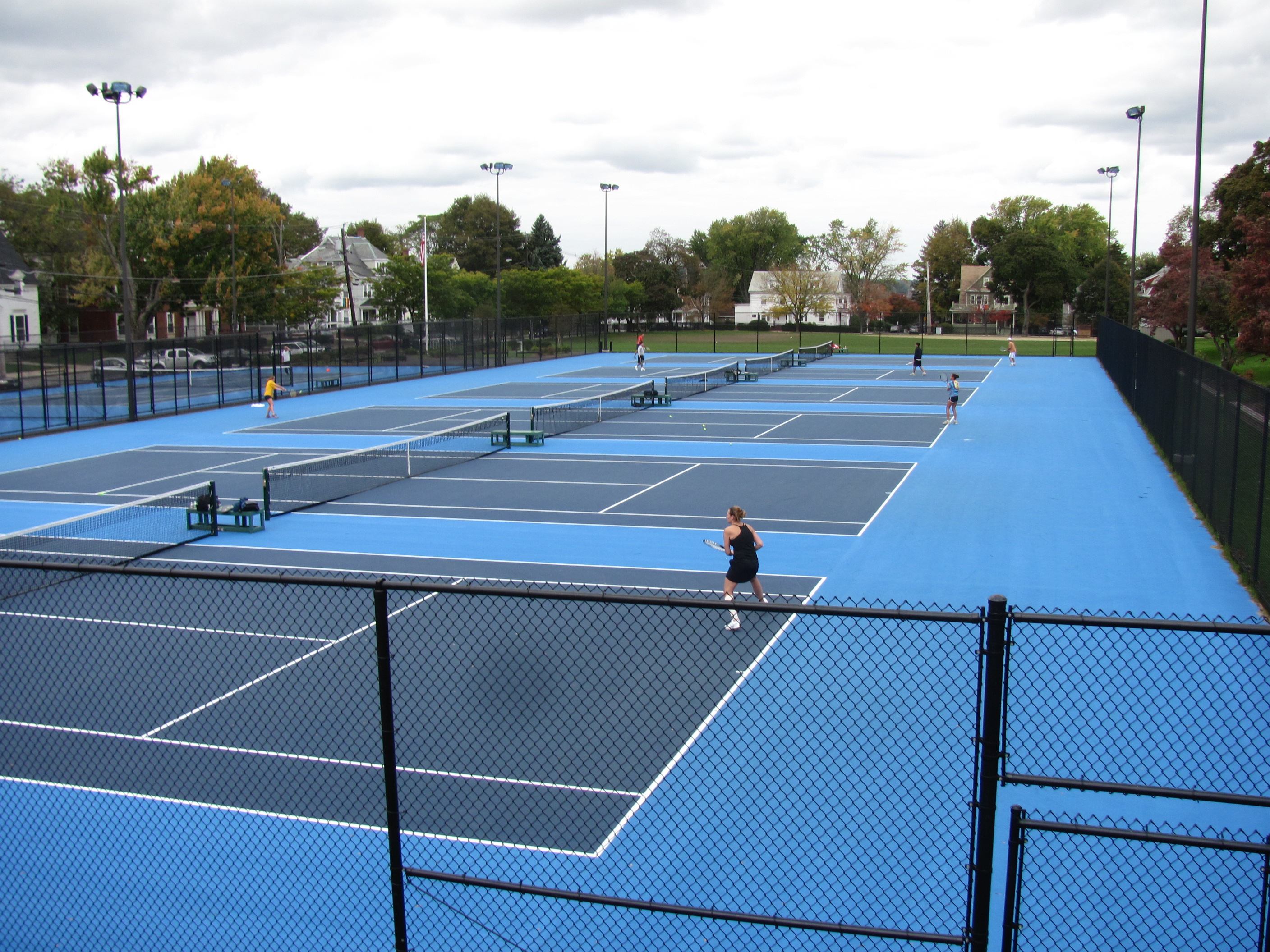
Tufts tennis courts

Venue	Sport(s)	Open.	Capac.	Ref.
Ellis Oval	Football; Track and field	1894	4,400	
Bello Field	Soccer; Lacrosse	2004	n/a	
Sol Gittleman Park	Baseball	2023	n/a	
Cousens Gymnasium	Basketball	1932	1,600	
Ounjian Field	Field hockey	2016	n/a	
Spicer Field	Softball	1959	n/a	
Malden Valley Forum	Ice hockey	2001	n/a	
Tufts Squash Center	Squash	1999	n/a	

== National championships ==
All the championships won in NCAA D-III.

Sport	Title #	Year	Rival / runner-up	Score
Lacrosse (men's)	1	2010	Salisbury	9–6
Lacrosse (men's)	2	2014	Salisbury	12–9
Lacrosse (men's)	3	2015	Lynchburg	19–11
Lacrosse (men's)	4	2024	RIT	18–14
Lacrosse (men's)	5	2025	Dickinson	25–8
Lacrosse (men's)	6	2026	RIT	17–11
Soccer (men's)	1	2014	Wheaton (IL)	4–2
Soccer (men's)	2	2016	Calvin	1–0 ^{OT}
Soccer (men's)	3	2018	Calvin	2–1
Soccer (men's)	4	2019	Amherst College	2–0
Soccer (men's)	5	2025	Trinity (TX)	2–1 ^{OT}
Softball	1	2013	SUNY Cortland	6–0, 6–5
Softball	2	2014	Salisbury	1–2, 6–0, 6–0
Softball	3	2015	UT Tyler	2–0, 7–4
Field Hockey	1	2012	Montclair State	2–1
Field Hockey	2	2025	Johns Hopkins	2–1
Rowing (women's)	1	2024	Wesleyan	
Rowing (women's)	2	2025	Williams	
Rowing (women's)	3	2026	Bates	
