= List of Boston College Eagles men's ice hockey seasons =

This is a season-by-season list of records compiled by Boston College in men's ice hockey.

Boston College has made thirty three appearances in the NCAA Tournament, winning the national title five times.

== Season-by-season results ==
Note: GP = Games played, W = Wins, L = Losses, T = Ties

NCAA D-I Champions (1948–present)	NCAA Frozen Four (1948–present)	Conference regular season champions	Conference Playoff Champions

Season	Conference	Regular Season (Note: Code explanation; GP—Games Played, W—Wins, L—Losses, T—Tied games, OTW—Overtime Wins, OTL—Overtime Loses, 3/SW—Win in 3 on 3 overtime or shootout, Pts—Points*)														Conference Tournament Results	National Tournament Results
Season	Conference	Conference									Overall					Conference Tournament Results	National Tournament Results
Season	Conference	GP	W	L	T	OTW	OTL	3/SW	Pts*	Finish	GP	W	L	T	%	Conference Tournament Results	National Tournament Results
Bob Fowler (1917–1919)
1917–18	Independent	–	–	–	–	–	–	–	–	–	3	2	1	0	.667		
1918–19	Independent	–	–	–	–	–	–	–	–	–	3	2	1	0	.667		
Walter Falvey (1919–1920)
1919–20	Independent	–	–	–	–	–	–	–	–	–	7	6	1	0	.857		
Fred Rocque (1920–1923)
1920–21	Independent	–	–	–	–	–	–	–	–	–	8	6	2	0	.750		
1921–22	Independent	–	–	–	–	–	–	–	–	–	9	5	3	1	.611		
1922–23	Independent	–	–	–	–	–	–	–	–	–	14	12	1	1	.893		
Charles Foote (1923–1925)
1923–24	Independent	–	–	–	–	–	–	–	–	–	18	7	10	1	.417		
1924–25	Independent	–	–	–	–	–	–	–	–	–	17	8	6	3	.559		
Fred Rocque (1925–1927)
1925–26	Independent	–	–	–	–	–	–	–	–	–	16	6	9	1	.406		
1926–27	Independent	–	–	–	–	–	–	–	–	–	6	3	3	0	.500		
Sonny Foley (1927–1929)
1927–28	Independent	–	–	–	–	–	–	–	–	–	7	2	4	1	.357		
1928–29	Independent	–	–	–	–	–	–	–	–	–	14	5	9	0	.357		
Program suspended due to Great Depression
John Kelley (1932–1942)
1932–33	Independent	–	–	–	–	–	–	–	–	–	6	3	2	1	.583		
1933–34	Independent	–	–	–	–	–	–	–	–	–	9	2	6	1	.278		
1934–35	Independent	–	–	–	–	–	–	–	–	–	10	7	3	0	.700		
1935–36	Independent	–	–	–	–	–	–	–	–	–	12	7	4	1	.625		
1936–37	Independent	–	–	–	–	–	–	–	–	–	13	8	4	1	.654		
1937–38	Independent	–	–	–	–	–	–	–	–	–	15	9	6	0	.600		
1938–39	Independent	–	–	–	–	–	–	–	–	–	16	9	7	0	.563		
1939–40	Independent	–	–	–	–	–	–	–	–	–	18	12	5	1	.694		
1940–41	Independent	–	–	–	–	–	–	–	–	–	14	13	1	0	.929		
1941–42	Independent	–	–	–	–	–	–	–	–	–	14	12	2	0	.857		
John Temple (1942–1943)
1942–43	Independent	–	–	–	–	–	–	–	–	–	9	7	2	0	.778		
Program suspended due to World War II
Joseph Galvin (1945–1946)
1945–46	Independent	–	–	–	–	–	–	–	–	–	3	1	2	0	.333		
John Kelley (1946–1972)
1946–47	Independent	–	–	–	–	–	–	–	–	–	19	15	3	1	.816		
1947–48	Independent	–	–	–	–	–	–	–	–	–	19	14	5	0	.737		Lost Semifinal 4–6 (Michigan)
1948–49	Independent	–	–	–	–	–	–	–	–	–	22	21	1	0	.955		Won Semifinal 7–3 (Colorado College); Won NCAA Championship 4–3 (Dartmouth)
1949–50	Independent	–	–	–	–	–	–	–	–	–	19	14	5	0	.737		Lost Semifinal 10–3 (Colorado College); Lost Consolation Game 6–10 (Michigan)
1950–51	Independent	–	–	–	–	–	–	–	–	–	20	12	8	0	.600		
1951–52	Independent	–	–	–	–	–	–	–	–	–	20	17	3	0	.850		
1952–53	Independent	–	–	–	–	–	–	–	–	–	16	11	4	1	.719		
1953–54	Independent	–	–	–	–	–	–	–	–	–	21	17	4	0	.809		Lost Semifinal 1–14 (Minnesota); Lost Consolation Game 2–7 (Michigan)
1954–55	Independent	–	–	–	–	–	–	–	–	–	21	13	8	0	.619		
1955–56	Independent	–	–	–	–	–	–	–	–	–	22	14	8	0	.636		Lost Semifinal 4–10 (Michigan Tech); Lost Consolation Game 2–6 (St. Lawrence)
1956–57	Independent	–	–	–	–	–	–	–	–	–	22	14	7	1	.659		
1957–58	Independent	–	–	–	–	–	–	–	–	–	23	9	12	2	.435		
1958–59	Independent	–	–	–	–	–	–	–	–	–	28	20	8	0	.714		Lost Semifinal 3–4 (Michigan State); Won Consolation Game 7–6 (St. Lawrence)
1959–50	Independent	–	–	–	–	–	–	–	–	–	25	15	9	1	.620		
1960–61	Independent	–	–	–	–	–	–	–	–	–	25	19	5	1	.780		
1961–62	ECAC Hockey	25	13	11	1	–	–	–	.540	12th	29	15	13	1	.534	Lost Quarterfinal 3–5 (St. Lawrence)	
1962–63	ECAC Hockey	24	19	5	0	–	–	–	.792	3rd	31	22	9	0	.710	Won Quarterfinal 3–1 (Army); Won Semifinal 6–2 (St. Lawrence); Lost Championship 3–4 (Harvard)	Lost Semifinal 2–8 (North Dakota); Lost Consolation Game 3–5 (Clarkson)
1963–64	ECAC Hockey	24	16	7	1	–	–	–	.688	5th	28	18	9	1	.661	Lost Quarterfinal 2–3 (Rensselaer)	
University Division
1964–65	ECAC Hockey	20	15	5	0	–	–	–	.750	2nd	31	24	7	0	.774	Won Quarterfinal 4–1 (Dartmouth); Won Semifinal 3–2 (Clarkson); Won Championship 6–2 (Brown)	Won Semifinal 4–3 (North Dakota); Lost Championship 2–8 (Michigan Tech)
1965–66	ECAC Hockey	22	12	10	0	–	–	–	.545	6th	28	16	12	0	.571	Lost Quarterfinal 0–9 (Cornell)	
1966–67	ECAC Hockey	20	14	6	0	–	–	–	.700	3rd	28	20	8	0	.714	Won Quarterfinal 9–2 (Clarkson); Lost Semifinal 2–12 (Cornell); Won Third-place game 6–4 (St. Lawrence)	
1967–68	ECAC Hockey	23	14	8	1	–	–	–	.630	7th	31	19	11	1	.629	Won Quarterfinal 7–6 (St. Lawrence); Won Semifinal 6–5 (Clarkson); Lost Championship 3–6 (Cornell)	Lost Semifinal 1–4 (Denver); Lost Consolation Game 1–6 (Cornell)
1968–69	ECAC Hockey	21	16	5	0	–	–	–	.762	2nd	26	19	7	0	.731	Lost Quarterfinal 2–4 (Clarkson)	
1969–70	ECAC Hockey	21	14	7	0	–	–	–	.667	16th	26	16	10	0	.615	Lost Quarterfinal 5–10 (Harvard)	
1970–71	ECAC Hockey	21	9	12	0	–	–	–	.429	10th	26	11	15	0	.423		
1971–72	ECAC Hockey	21	10	11	0	–	–	–	.476	10th	30	14	16	0	.467		
Len Ceglarski (1972–1992)
1972–73	ECAC Hockey	19	13	5	1	–	–	–	.711	3rd	30	22	7	1	.750	Won Quarterfinal 4–2 (New Hampshire); Won Semifinal 5–3 (Pennsylvania); Lost Championship 2–3 (Cornell)	Lost Semifinal 4–10 (Denver)†; Won Consolation Game 3–1 (Cornell)
Division I
1973–74	ECAC Hockey	19	8	11	0	–	–	–	.421	T–11th	28	16	12	0	.571		
1974–75	ECAC Hockey	20	6	12	2	–	–	–	.350	12th	28	11	15	2	.429		
1975–76	ECAC Hockey	21	11	9	1	–	–	–	.548	8th	29	15	13	1	.534	Lost Quarterfinal 5–6 (Boston University)	
1976–77	ECAC Hockey	23	13	9	1	–	–	–	.587	5th	30	18	11	1	.617	Lost Quarterfinal 7–8 (Boston University)	
1977–78	ECAC Hockey	23	14	9	0	–	–	–	.609	5th	34	24	10	0	.706	Won Quarterfinal 7–6 (Rensselaer); Won Semifinal 6–4 (Brown); Won Championship 4–2 (Providence)	Won Semifinal 6–2 (Bowling Green); Lost Championship 3–5 (Boston University)
1978–79	ECAC Hockey	22	10	12	0	–	–	–	.455	11th	30	16	14	0	.533		
1979–80	ECAC Hockey	22	18	3	1	–	–	–	.841	1st	33	25	7	1	.773	Lost Quarterfinal 1–5 (Cornell)	
1980–81	ECAC Hockey	22	13	6	3	–	–	–	.659	2nd	31	20	8	3	.694	Lost Quarterfinal 2–5 (Providence)	
1981–82	ECAC Hockey	21	13	8	0	–	–	–	.619	4th	30	19	11	0	.633	Lost Quarterfinal 0–2 (Harvard)	
1982–83	ECAC Hockey	21	9	10	2	–	–	–	.476	11th	30	15	13	2	.533		
1983–84	ECAC Hockey	21	15	6	0	–	–	–	.714	T–2nd	39	26	13	0	.667	Won Quarterfinal series 2–1 (Providence); Lost Semifinal 4–6 (Boston University); Lost Third-place game 1–3 (Clarkson)	Lost Quarterfinal series 8–13 (Michigan State)
1984–85	Hockey East	34	24	9	1	–	–	–	49	1st	45	28	15	2	.644	Won Semifinal 6–5 (Lowell); Lost Championship 1–2 (Providence)	Won Quarterfinal series 9–8 (Minnesota); Lost Semifinal 3–4 (Providence); Lost Consolation Game 6–7 (Minnesota–Duluth)
1985–86	Hockey East	34	23	9	2	–	–	–	48	1st	42	26	13	3	.655	Won Semifinal 5–2 (Lowell); Lost Championship 4–9 (Boston University)	Lost Quarterfinal series 6–10 (Michigan State)
1986–87	Hockey East	32	26	6	0	–	–	–	52	1st	39	31	8	0	.795	Won Semifinal 9–3 (Northeastern); Won Championship 4–2 (Maine)	Lost Quarterfinal series 4–6 (Minnesota)
1987–88	Hockey East	26	10	14	2	–	–	–	22	5th	34	13	18	3	.426	Lost Quarterfinal series 0–1–1 (Lowell)	
1988–89	Hockey East	26	16	6	4	–	–	–	36	1st	40	25	11	4	.675	Won Semifinal 6–5 (Providence); Lost Championship 4–5 (Maine)	Won First round series 2–0 (Bowling Green); Lost Quarterfinal series 1–2 (Michigan State)
1989–90	Hockey East	21	15	6	0	–	–	–	30	1st	42	28	13	1	.679	Won Quarterfinal series 2–1 (Merrimack); Won Semifinal 5–4 (New Hampshire); Won Championship 4–3 (Maine)	Won Quarterfinal series 2–1 (Minnesota); Lost Semifinal 1–2 (Wisconsin)
1990–91	Hockey East	21	16	5	0	–	–	–	32	1st	39	27	12	0	.692	Lost Quarterfinal 5–6 (Northeastern)	Lost First round series 0–2 (Alaska–Anchorage)
1991–92	Hockey East	21	10	9	2	–	–	–	22	5th	36	15	18	3	.458	Won Quarterfinal 5–2 (Boston University); Lost Semifinal 3–7 (Maine)	
Steve Cedorchuk (1992–1994)
1992–93	Hockey East	24	6	15	3	–	–	–	15	7th	38	9	24	5	.302	Lost Quarterfinal series 0–2 (Boston University)	
1993–94	Hockey East	24	7	12	5	–	–	–	19	6th	36	15	16	5	.486	Lost Quarterfinal series 0–2 (New Hampshire)	
Jerry York (1994–2022)
1994–95	Hockey East	24	8	14	2	–	–	1	45	8th	35	11	22	2	.343	Lost Play-In 4–5 (Massachusetts)	
1995–96	Hockey East	24	12	10	2	–	–	1	65	5th	36	16	17	3	.486	Lost Quarterfinal series 0–2 (Providence)	
1996–97	Hockey East	24	9	12	3	–	–	–	21	6th	38	15	19	4	.447	Won Quarterfinal series 2–0 (Merrimack); Lost Semifinal 0–4 (New Hampshire)	
1997–98	Hockey East	24	15	5	4	–	–	–	34	2nd	42	28	9	5	.726	Won Quarterfinal series 2–0 (Providence); Won Semifinal 7–2 (Merrimack); Won Championship 3–2 (Maine)	Won Regional semifinal 6–1 (Colorado College); Won National semifinal 5–2 (Ohio State); Lost National Championship 2–3 (Michigan)
1998–99	Hockey East	24	15	7	2	–	–	–	32	3rd	43	27	12	4	.674	Won Quarterfinal series 2–0 (Massachusetts–Lowell); Won Semifinal 3–2 (Maine); Won Championship 5–4 (New Hampshire)	Won Regional Quarterfinal 2–1 (Northern Michigan); Won Regional semifinal 2–1 (North Dakota); Lost National semifinal 1–2 (Maine)
1999–00	Hockey East	24	15	8	1	–	–	–	31	3rd	42	29	12	1	.702	Won Quarterfinal series 2–0 (Northeastern); Won Semifinal 2–1 (New Hampshire); Lost Championship 1–2 (Maine)	Won Regional Quarterfinal 6–5 (Michigan State); Won Regional semifinal 4–1 (Wisconsin); Won National semifinal 4–2 (St. Lawrence); Lost National Championship 2–4 (North Dakota)
2000–01	Hockey East	24	17	5	2	–	–	–	36	1st	43	33	8	2	.791	Won Quarterfinal series 2–0 (Merrimack); Won Semifinal 5–1 (Massachusetts–Lowell); Won Championship 5–3 (Providence)	Won Regional semifinal 3–1 (Maine); Won National semifinal 4–2 (Michigan); Won National Championship 3–2 (North Dakota)
2001–02	Hockey East	24	10	13	1	–	–	–	21	6th	38	18	18	2	.500	Lost Quarterfinal series 0–2 (Maine)	
2002–03	Hockey East	24	16	6	2	–	–	–	34	T–1st	39	24	11	4	.667	Won Quarterfinal series 2–0 (Merrimack); Lost Semifinal 5–6 (Boston University)	Won Regional semifinal 1–0 (Ohio State); Lost Regional final 1–2 (Cornell)
2003–04	Hockey East	24	17	4	3	–	–	–	37	1st	42	29	9	4	.738	Lost Quarterfinal series 1–2 (Boston University)	Won Regional semifinal 5–2 (Niagara); Won Regional final 3–2 (Michigan); Lost National semifinal 1–2 (Maine)
2004–05	Hockey East	24	14	3	7	–	–	–	35	1st	40	26	7	7	.738	Won Quarterfinal series 2–0 (Massachusetts); Won Semifinal 2–1 (Maine); Won Championship 3–1 (New Hampshire)	Won Regional semifinal 5–4 (Mercyhurst); Lost Regional final 3–6 (North Dakota)
2005–06	Hockey East	24	17	8	2	–	–	–	36	T–2nd	42	26	13	3	.655	Won Quarterfinal series 2–0 (Vermont); Won Semifinal 4–1 (Maine); Lost Championship 1–2 (Boston University)	Won Regional semifinal 5–0 (Miami); Won Regional final 5–0 (Boston University); Won National semifinal 6–5 (North Dakota); Lost National Championship 1–2 (Wisconsin)
2006–07	Hockey East	27	18	8	1	–	–	–	35	2nd	42	29	12	1	.702	Won Quarterfinal series 2–0 (Northeastern); Won Semifinal 6–2 (Boston University); Won Championship 5–2 (New Hampshire)	Won Regional semifinal 4–1 (St. Lawrence); Won Regional final 4–0 (Miami); Won National semifinal 6–4 (North Dakota); Lost National Championship 1–3 (Michigan State)
2007–08	Hockey East	27	11	9	7	–	–	–	29	4th	44	25	11	8	.659	Won Quarterfinal series 2–0 (Providence); Won Semifinal 5–4 (New Hampshire); Won Championship 4–0 (Vermont)	Won Regional semifinal 5–2 (Minnesota); Won Regional final 4–3 (Miami); Won National semifinal 6–1 (North Dakota); Won National Championship 4–1 (Notre Dame)
2008–09	Hockey East	27	11	11	5	–	–	–	27	6th	37	18	14	5	.554	Won Quarterfinal series 2–0 (New Hampshire); Lost Semifinal 2–3 (Boston University)	
2009–10	Hockey East	27	16	8	3	–	–	–	35	2nd	42	29	10	3	.726	Won Quarterfinal series 2–0 (Massachusetts); Won Semifinal 3–0 (Vermont); Won Championship 7–6 (Maine)	Won Regional semifinal 3–1 (Alaska); Won Regional final 9–7 (Yale); Won National semifinal 7–1 (Miami); Won National Championship 5–0 (Wisconsin)
2010–11	Hockey East	27	20	6	1	–	–	–	41	1st	39	30	8	1	.782	Won Quarterfinal series 2–0 (Massachusetts); Won Semifinal 5–4 (Northeastern); Won Championship 5–3 (Merrimack)	Lost Regional semifinal 4–8 (Colorado College)
2011–12	Hockey East	27	19	7	1	–	–	–	39	1st	44	33	10	1	.761	Won Quarterfinal series 2–0 (Massachusetts); Won Semifinal 4–2 (Providence); Won Championship 4–1 (Maine)	Won Regional semifinal 2–0 (Air Force); Won Regional final 4–0 (Minnesota–Duluth); Won National semifinal 6–1 (Minnesota); Won National Championship 4–1 (Ferris State)
2012–13	Hockey East	27	15	9	2	–	–	–	33	2nd	38	22	12	4	.632	Won Quarterfinal series 2–0 (Vermont); Lost Semifinal 3–6 (Boston University)	Lost Regional semifinal 1–5 (Union)
2013–14	Hockey East	20	16	2	2	–	–	–	34	1st	40	28	8	4	.750	Lost Quarterfinal series 1–2 (Notre Dame)	Won Regional semifinal 6–2 (Denver); Won Regional final 4–3 (Massachusetts–Lowell); Lost National semifinal 4–5 (Union)
2014–15	Hockey East	22	12	7	3	–	–	–	27	T–2nd	38	21	14	3	.592	Lost Quarterfinal series 1–2 (Vermont)	Lost Regional semifinal 2–5 (Denver)
2015–16	Hockey East	22	15	2	5	–	–	–	35	T–1st	41	28	8	5	.744	Won Quarterfinal series 2–1 (Vermont); Lost Semifinal 4–5 (Northeastern)	Won Regional semifinal 4–1 (Harvard); Won Regional final 3–2 (Minnesota–Duluth); Lost National semifinal 2–3 (Quinnipiac)
2016–17	Hockey East	22	13	6	3	–	–	–	29	T–1st	40	21	15	4	.575	Won Quarterfinal series 2–0 (Vermont); Won Semifinal 3–2 (Boston University); Lost Championship 3–4 (Massachusetts–Lowell)	
2017–18	Hockey East	24	18	6	0	–	–	–	36	1st	37	20	14	3	.581	Won Quarterfinal series 2–0 (Merrimack); Lost Semifinal 3–4 (Boston University)	
2018–19	Hockey East	24	10	11	3	–	–	–	23	7th	39	14	22	3	.397	Won Quarterfinal series, 2–1 (Providence); Won Semifinal, 3–0 (Massachusetts); Lost Championship, 2–3 (Northeastern)	
2019–20	Hockey East	24	17	6	1	–	–	–	35	1st	34	24	8	2	.735	Quarterfinal series, No Contest (Providence); Tournament cancelled due to COVID-19 pandemic	Tournament cancelled due to COVID-19 pandemic
2020–21	Hockey East	21	16	4	1	3	2	0	48	1st ^{‡}	24	17	6	1	.729	Won Quarterfinal, 3–2 (New Hampshire); Lost Semifinal, 5–6 (2OT) (UMass Lowell)	Regional semifinal, No Contest ^{#} (Notre Dame); Lost Regional semifinal, 1–4 (St. Cloud State)
2021–22	Hockey East	24	9	12	3	0	1	1	32	8th	38	15	18	5	.461	Won Opening Round, 4–3 (OT) (New Hampshire); Lost Quarterfinal, 2–3 (Northeastern)	
Greg Brown (2022–Present)
2022–23	Hockey East	24	8	11	5	0	0	1	30	8th	36	14	16	6	.472	Won Opening Round, 7–3 (Massachusetts); Lost Quarterfinal, 0–1 (2OT) (Merrimack)	
2023–24	Hockey East	24	20	3	1	1	0	1	61	1st	41	34	6	1	.841	Won Quarterfinal, 5–4 (Connecticut); Won Semifinal, 8–1 (Massachusetts); Won Championship, 6–2 (Boston University)	Won Regional Semifinal, 6–1 (Michigan Tech); Won Regional Final, 5–4 (OT) (Quinnipiac); Won National Semifinal, 4–0 (Michigan); Lost National Championship, 0–2 (Denver)
2024–25	Hockey East	24	18	4	2	2	0	1	61	1st	37	27	8	2	.757	Lost Quarterfinal, 1–3 (Northeastern)	Won Regional Semifinal, 3–1 (Bentley); Lost Regional Final, 1–3 (Denver)
Totals											GP	W	L	T	%	Championships	
Regular season											2625	1600	863	162	.640	1 ECAC Championship, 19 Hockey East Championships	
Conference Post-season											151	95	55	1	.632	2 ECAC tournament championships, 12 Hockey East tournament championships	
NCAA Post-season											95	53	42	0	.558	38 NCAA Tournament appearances, 26 Frozen Four appearances	
Regular season and Post-season Record											2871	1748	960	163	.637	5 National Championships	

* Winning percentage is used when conference schedules are unbalanced.
† Denver's participation in the 1973 tournament was later vacated.
‡ Hockey East did not officially award a conference regular season title in the 2020–21 season, due to scheduling disparities caused by the COVID-19 pandemic.
# Notre Dame was forced to withdraw from the 2021 NCAA Tournament due to positive COVID-19 tests; BC advanced automatically.
