= List of Harvard Crimson men's ice hockey seasons =

This is a season-by-season list of records compiled by Harvard in men's ice hockey.

Harvard University has won one NCAA Championship in its history and is one of the oldest programs in the world, having played ice hockey since the late 19th century and suspended three seasons only due to World Wars.

== Season-by-season results ==
Note: GP = Games played, W = Wins, L = Losses, T = Ties

| NCAA D-I Champions | NCAA Frozen Four | Conference regular season champions | Conference Division Champions | Conference Playoff Champions |

| Season | Conference | Regular Season (Note: Code explanation; GP—Games Played, W—Wins, L—Losses, T—Tied games, OTW—Overtime Wins, OTL—Overtime Loses, 3/SW—Win in 3 on 3 overtime or shootout, Pts—Points*) | | | | | | | | | | | | | | Conference Tournament Results | National Tournament Results |
| Season | Conference | Conference | | | | | | | | | Overall | | | | | Conference Tournament Results | National Tournament Results |
| Season | Conference | GP | W | L | T | OTW | OTL | 3/SW | Pts* | Finish | GP | W | L | T | % | Conference Tournament Results | National Tournament Results |
|---|---|---|---|---|---|---|---|---|---|---|---|---|---|---|---|---|---|
No Coach (1897–1903)
| 1897–98 | Independent | – | – | – | – | – | – | – | – | – | 4 | 3 | 1 | 0 | .750 | | |
| 1898–99 | Independent | – | – | – | – | – | – | – | – | – | 1 | 0 | 1 | 0 | .000 | | |
| 1899–1900 | Independent | – | – | – | – | – | – | – | – | – | 9 | 7 | 1 | 1 | .833 | | |
| 1900–01 | Independent | – | – | – | – | – | – | – | – | – | 3 | 3 | 0 | 0 | 1.000 | | |
| 1901–02 | IHA | 4 | 3 | 1 | 0 | – | – | – | .750 | 2nd | 6 | 3 | 3 | 0 | .500 | Lost Championship series, 0–2 (Yale) | |
| 1902–03 | IHA | 4 | 4 | 0 | 0 | – | – | – | 1.000 | 1st | 10 | 10 | 0 | 0 | 1.000 | Won Championship series, 2–0 (Yale) | Intercollegiate Champion |
Alfred Winsor (1903–1917)
| 1903–04 | IHA | 3 | 3 | 0 | 0 | – | – | – | 1.000 | 1st | 6 | 6 | 0 | 0 | 1.000 | Won Championship, 4–3 (3OT) (Yale) | Intercollegiate Champion |
| 1904–05 | IHA | 4 | 4 | 0 | 0 | – | – | – | 1.000 | 1st | 10 | 10 | 0 | 0 | 1.000 | | Intercollegiate Champion |
| 1905–06 | IHA | 4 | 4 | 0 | 0 | – | – | – | 1.000 | 1st | 6 | 5 | 0 | 1 | .917 | | Intercollegiate Champion |
| 1906–07 | IHA | 4 | 3 | 1 | 0 | – | – | – | .750 | 2nd | 10 | 8 | 2 | 0 | .800 | | |
| 1907–08 | IHA | 4 | 3 | 1 | 0 | – | – | – | .750 | 2nd | 9 | 7 | 2 | 0 | .778 | | |
| 1908–09 | IHA | 4 | 4 | 0 | 0 | – | – | – | 1.000 | 1st | 9 | 9 | 0 | 0 | 1.000 | | Intercollegiate Champion |
| 1909–10 | IHA | 5 | 4 | 1 | 0 | – | – | – | .800 | 2nd | 8 | 6 | 2 | 0 | .750 | | |
| 1910–11 | IHA | 5 | 4 | 1 | 0 | – | – | – | .800 | 2nd | 10 | 8 | 2 | 0 | .800 | | |
| 1911–12 | Independent | – | – | – | – | – | – | – | – | – | 10 | 7 | 3 | 0 | .700 | | |
| 1912–13 | IHL | 5 | 4 | 1 | 0 | – | – | – | .800 | 1st | 11 | 9 | 2 | 0 | .818 | | Intercollegiate Champion |
| 1913–14 | IHL | 6 | 3 | 3 | 0 | – | – | – | .500 | 2nd | 16 | 8 | 8 | 0 | .500 | | |
| 1914–15 | IHL | 4 | 4 | 0 | 0 | – | – | – | 1.000 | 1st | 13 | 9 | 4 | 0 | .692 | | |
| 1915–16 | IHL | 4 | 4 | 0 | 0 | – | – | – | 1.000 | 1st | 10 | 8 | 2 | 0 | .800 | | Intercollegiate Champion |
| 1916–17 | IHL | 6 | 3 | 3 | 0 | – | – | – | .500 | T–1st | 1 | 8 | 4 | 0 | .667 | | |
Program suspended due to World War I
No Coach (1918–1919)
| 1918–19 | Independent | – | – | – | – | – | – | – | – | – | 7 | 7 | 0 | 0 | 1.000 | | |
William Claflin (1919–1923)
| 1919–20 | Triangular League | 4 | 4 | 0 | 0 | – | – | – | 1.000 | 1st | 13 | 10 | 3 | 0 | .769 | | Intercollegiate Champion |
| 1920–21 | Triangular League | 3 | 3 | 0 | 0 | – | – | – | 1.000 | 1st | 10 | 8 | 2 | 0 | .800 | | Intercollegiate Champion |
| 1921–22 | Triangular League | 4 | 4 | 0 | 0 | – | – | – | 1.000 | 1st | 11 | 8 | 1 | 2 | .818 | | Eastern Intercollegiate Champion |
| 1922–23 | Triangular League | 6 | 4 | 2 | 0 | – | – | – | .667 | 1st | 12 | 8 | 4 | 0 | .667 | | |
Alfred Winsor (1923–1924)
| 1923–24 | Triangular League | 4 | 2 | 2 | 0 | – | – | – | .500 | 2nd | 14 | 6 | 7 | 1 | .464 | | |
Edward Bigelow (1924–1927)
| 1924–25 | Triangular League | 4 | 2 | 2 | 0 | – | – | – | .500 | 2nd | 12 | 8 | 4 | 0 | .667 | | |
| 1925–26 | Triangular League | 4 | 4 | 0 | 0 | – | – | – | 1.000 | 1st | 11 | 8 | 3 | 0 | .727 | | Eastern Intercollegiate Champion |
| 1926–27 | Independent | – | – | – | – | – | – | – | – | – | 12 | 9 | 1 | 2 | .833 | | Eastern Intercollegiate Champion |
Joseph Stubbs (1927–1938)
| 1927–28 | Independent | – | – | – | – | – | – | – | – | – | 9 | 7 | 2 | 0 | .778 | | |
| 1928–29 | Independent | – | – | – | – | – | – | – | – | – | 10 | 5 | 4 | 1 | .550 | | |
| 1929–30 | Independent | – | – | – | – | – | – | – | – | – | 12 | 7 | 4 | 1 | .625 | | Eastern Intercollegiate co-Champion |
| 1930–31 | Independent | – | – | – | – | – | – | – | – | – | 13 | 11 | 2 | 0 | .846 | | |
| 1931–32 | Independent | – | – | – | – | – | – | – | – | – | 14 | 11 | 1 | 2 | .857 | | Eastern Intercollegiate Champion |
| 1932–33 | Quadrangular League | 6 | 6 | 2 | 0 | – | – | – | .750 | 1st | 14 | 9 | 5 | 0 | .643 | | Eastern Intercollegiate Champion |
| 1933–34 | Quadrangular League | 7 | 1 | 6 | 0 | – | – | – | .143 | 4th | 13 | 4 | 9 | 0 | .308 | | |
| 1934–35 | Quadrangular League | 7 | 5 | 2 | 0 | – | – | – | .714 | 2nd | 12 | 8 | 4 | 0 | .667 | | |
| 1935–36 | Quadrangular League | 8 | 6 | 2 | 0 | – | – | – | .750 | 1st | 17 | 12 | 4 | 1 | .735 | | Eastern Intercollegiate co-Champion |
| 1936–37 | Quadrangular League | 6 | 6 | 0 | 0 | – | – | – | 1.000 | 1st | 16 | 15 | 1 | 0 | .938 | | Eastern Intercollegiate Champion |
| 1937–38 | Quadrangular League | 7 | 2 | 4 | 1 | – | – | – | .357 | 3rd | 14 | 6 | 7 | 1 | .464 | | |
Clark Hodder (1938–1942)
| 1938–39 | Quadrangular League | 6 | 3 | 2 | 1 | – | – | – | .583 | 2nd | 15 | 7 | 7 | 1 | .500 | | |
| 1939–40 | Quadrangular League | 6 | 0 | 6 | 0 | – | – | – | .000 | 4th | 14 | 3 | 10 | 1 | .250 | | |
| 1940–41 | Quadrangular League | 6 | 0 | 5 | 1 | – | – | – | .083 | 4th | 12 | 2 | 9 | 1 | .208 | | |
| 1941–42 | Quadrangular League | 6 | 1 | 5 | 0 | – | – | – | .167 | 4th | 16 | 8 | 8 | 0 | .500 | | |
John Chase (1942–1943)
| 1942–43 | Quadrangular League | 6 | 3 | 3 | 0 | – | – | – | .500 | 2nd | 18 | 14 | 3 | 1 | .806 | | |
Program suspended due to World War II
John Chase (1945–1950)
| 1945–46 | Independent | – | – | – | – | – | – | – | – | – | 8 | 2 | 4 | 2 | .375 | | |
| 1946–47 | Pentagonal League | 7 | 3 | 4 | 0 | – | – | – | .429 | 3rd | 12 | 6 | 6 | 0 | .500 | | |
| 1947–48 | Pentagonal League | 7 | 3 | 4 | 0 | – | – | – | .429 | 3rd | 23 | 9 | 14 | 0 | .391 | | |
| 1948–49 | Pentagonal League | 8 | 6 | 2 | 0 | – | – | – | .750 | 2nd | 20 | 12 | 8 | 0 | .600 | Lost Playoff, 2–7 (Dartmouth) | |
| 1949–50 | Pentagonal League | 8 | 3 | 5 | 0 | – | – | – | .375 | 4th | 18 | 10 | 8 | 0 | .556 | | |
Cooney Weiland (1950–1971)
| 1950–51 | Pentagonal League | 8 | 2 | 6 | 0 | – | – | – | .250 | 5th | 23 | 12 | 11 | 0 | .522 | | |
| 1951–52 | Pentagonal League | 8 | 3 | 5 | 0 | – | – | – | .375 | 4th | 19 | 8 | 11 | 0 | .421 | | |
| 1952–53 | Pentagonal League | 8 | 5 | 3 | 0 | – | – | – | .625 | T–2nd | 17 | 11 | 5 | 1 | .676 | | |
| 1953–54 | Pentagonal League | 8 | 5 | 1 | 2 | – | – | – | .750 | 1st | 22 | 10 | 10 | 2 | .500 | | |
| 1954–55 | Pentagonal League | 8 | 7 | 0 | 1 | – | – | – | .938 | 1st | 21 | 17 | 3 | 1 | .833 | | Lost Semifinal 3–7 (Michigan); Won Third-place game 7–3 (St. Lawrence) |
| 1955–56 | Independent | – | – | – | – | – | – | – | – | – | 25 | 15 | 10 | 0 | .600 | | |
| 1956–57 | Independent | – | – | – | – | – | – | – | – | – | 26 | 21 | 5 | 0 | .808 | | Lost Semifinal 1–6 (Michigan); Lost Third-place game 1–2 (Clarkson) |
| 1957–58 | Independent | – | – | – | – | – | – | – | – | – | 29 | 18 | 10 | 1 | .638 | | Lost Semifinal 1–9 (North Dakota); Lost Third-place game 1–5 (Clarkson) |
| 1958–59 | Independent | – | – | – | – | – | – | – | – | – | 25 | 12 | 9 | 4 | .560 | | |
| 1959–60 | Independent | – | – | – | – | – | – | – | – | – | 24 | 16 | 7 | 1 | .688 | | |
| 1960–61 | Independent | – | – | – | – | – | – | – | – | – | 24 | 18 | 4 | 2 | .792 | | |
| 1961–62 | ECAC Hockey | 20 | 18 | 2 | 0 | – | – | – | .900 | 2nd | 26 | 21 | 5 | 0 | .808 | Won Quarterfinal 2–1 (Army); Lost Semifinal 5–6 (St. Lawrence); Won Third-place game 2–0 (Colby) | |
| 1962–63 | ECAC Hockey | 20 | 17 | 3 | 2 | – | – | – | .818 | 1st | 26 | 21 | 3 | 2 | .846 | Won Quarterfinal 5–3 (Colgate); Won Semifinal 6–4 (Clarkson); Won Championship 4–3 (Boston College) | |
| 1963–64 | ECAC Hockey | 21 | 15 | 6 | 0 | – | – | – | .714 | T–3rd | 24 | 17 | 7 | 0 | .708 | Lost Quarterfinal 4–6 (Clarkson) | |
University Division
| 1964–65 | ECAC Hockey | 20 | 7 | 13 | 0 | – | – | – | .350 | 11th | 24 | 9 | 15 | 0 | .375 | | |
| 1965–66 | ECAC Hockey | 19 | 8 | 11 | 0 | – | – | – | .421 | 9th | 23 | 10 | 12 | 1 | .457 | | |
| 1966–67 | ECAC Hockey | 21 | 10 | 11 | 0 | – | – | – | .476 | 9th | 23 | 11 | 12 | 0 | .478 | Lost Quarterfinal 2–6 (Boston University) | |
| 1967–68 | ECAC Hockey | 21 | 14 | 7 | 0 | – | – | – | .667 | T–4th | 24 | 15 | 9 | 0 | .625 | Lost Quarterfinal 3–6 (Boston University) | |
| 1968–69 | ECAC Hockey | 23 | 16 | 6 | 1 | – | – | – | .717 | 3rd | 28 | 19 | 8 | 1 | .696 | Won Quarterfinal 4–3 (New Hampshire); Won Semifinal 8–6 (Clarkson); Lost Championship 2–4 (Cornell) | Lost Semifinal 2–9 (Denver); Won Third-place game 6–5 (Michigan Tech) |
| 1969–70 | ECAC Hockey | 20 | 14 | 6 | 0 | – | – | – | .700 | 4th | 25 | 16 | 9 | 0 | .640 | Won Quarterfinal 10–5 (Boston College); Lost Semifinal 5–6 (Cornell); Lost Third-place game 2–8 (Boston University) | |
| 1970–71 | ECAC Hockey | 21 | 15 | 5 | 1 | – | – | – | .738 | 4th | 27 | 18 | 8 | 1 | .685 | Won Quarterfinal 4–3 (Brown); Won Semifinal 4–2 (Boston University); Won Championship 7–4 (Clarkson) | Lost Semifinal 5–6 (Minnesota); Lost Third-place game 0–1 (Denver) |
Bill Cleary (1971–1990)
| 1971–72 | ECAC Hockey | 21 | 16 | 4 | 1 | – | – | – | .786 | 2nd | 26 | 17 | 8 | 1 | .673 | Won Quarterfinal 6–5 (Clarkson); Lost Semifinal 1–3 (Boston University); Lost Third-place game 1–4 (New Hampshire) | |
| 1972–73 | ECAC Hockey | 18 | 14 | 3 | 1 | – | – | – | .806 | T–1st | 22 | 17 | 4 | 1 | .795 | Lost Quarterfinal 4–7 (Clarkson) | |
Division I
| 1973–74 | ECAC Hockey | 21 | 15 | 6 | 0 | – | – | – | .714 | 2nd | 29 | 17 | 11 | 1 | .603 | Won Quarterfinal 9–3 (Providence); Won Semifinal 7–2 (Rensselaer); Lost Championships 2–4 (Boston University) | Lost Semifinal 5–6 (Michigan Tech); Lost Third-place game 5–7 (Boston University) |
| 1974–75 | ECAC Hockey | 20 | 19 | 1 | 0 | – | – | – | .950 | 1st | 29 | 23 | 6 | 0 | .793 | Won Quarterfinal 10–5 (Clarkson); Won Semifinal 6–4 (Cornell); Lost Championships 3–7 (Boston University) | Lost Semifinal 4–6 (Minnesota); Lost Third-place game 5–10 (Boston University) |
| 1975–76 | ECAC Hockey | 20 | 10 | 7 | 3 | – | – | – | .575 | 7th | 26 | 13 | 10 | 3 | .558 | Won Quarterfinal 4–3 (New Hampshire); Lost Semifinal 4–8 (Boston University); Lost Third-place game 6–7 (Cornell) | |
| 1976–77 | ECAC Hockey | 22 | 12 | 10 | 0 | – | – | – | .545 | 9th | 26 | 14 | 12 | 0 | .538 | | |
| 1977–78 | ECAC Hockey | 23 | 10 | 13 | 0 | – | – | – | .435 | 10th | 26 | 12 | 14 | 0 | .462 | | |
| 1978–79 | ECAC Hockey | 22 | 5 | 16 | 1 | – | – | – | .250 | 14th | 26 | 7 | 18 | 1 | .288 | | |
| 1979–80 | ECAC Hockey | 21 | 7 | 11 | 3 | – | – | – | .405 | 12th | 26 | 8 | 15 | 3 | .365 | | |
| 1980–81 | ECAC Hockey | 21 | 8 | 12 | 1 | – | – | – | .405 | 14th | 26 | 11 | 14 | 1 | .442 | | |
| 1981–82 | ECAC Hockey | 21 | 11 | 8 | 2 | – | – | – | .571 | 8th | 30 | 13 | 15 | 2 | .467 | Won Quarterfinal 2–0 (Boston College); Won Semifinal 7–1 (Clarkson); Lost Championship 2–5 (Northeastern) | Lost Quarterfinal series 4–10 (Wisconsin) |
| 1982–83 | ECAC Hockey | 21 | 15 | 5 | 1 | – | – | – | .738 | T–2nd | 34 | 23 | 9 | 2 | .706 | Won Quarterfinal series 9–3 (Rensselaer); Won Semifinal 6–3 (New Hampshire); Won Championship 4–1 (Providence) | Won Quarterfinal series 9–8 (Michigan State); Won Semifinal 5–3 (Minnesota); Lost Championship 2–6 (Wisconsin) |
| 1983–84 | ECAC Hockey | 21 | 10 | 9 | 1 | – | – | – | .524 | 8th | 27 | 10 | 14 | 3 | .426 | Lost Quarterfinal series 1–0–1 (Clarkson) | |
| 1984–85 | ECAC Hockey | 21 | 15 | 5 | 1 | – | – | – | 31 | 2nd | 32 | 21 | 9 | 2 | .688 | Won Quarterfinal series 2–0 (Colgate); Won Semifinal 2–1 (Clarkson); Lost Championship 1–3 (Rensselaer) | Lost Quarterfinal series 4–8 (Minnesota–Duluth) |
| 1985–86 | ECAC Hockey | 21 | 18 | 3 | 0 | – | – | – | 36 | 1st | 34 | 25 | 8 | 1 | .750 | Won Quarterfinal series 2–0 (Colgate); Lost Semifinal 2–4 (Clarkson); Won Third-place game 6–3 (Yale) | Won Quarterfinal series 11–4 (Western Michigan); Won Semifinal 5–2 (Denver); Lost Championship 5–6 (Michigan State) |
| 1986–87 | ECAC Hockey | 22 | 20 | 2 | 0 | – | – | – | 40 | 1st | 34 | 28 | 6 | 0 | .824 | Won Quarterfinal series 2–0 (Brown); Won Semifinal 4–1 (Rensselaer); Won Championship 6–3 (St. Lawrence) | Won Quarterfinal series 10–1 (Bowling Green); Lost Semifinal 2–5 (North Dakota); Lost Third-place game 3–6 (Minnesota) |
| 1987–88 | ECAC Hockey | 22 | 18 | 4 | 0 | – | – | – | 36 | T–1st | 32 | 21 | 11 | 0 | .656 | Won Quarterfinal series 2–0 (Rensselaer); Lost Semifinal 4–6 (Clarkson); Won Third-place game 7–1 (Vermont) | Lost First round series 8–11 (Michigan State) |
| 1988–89 | ECAC Hockey | 22 | 20 | 2 | 0 | – | – | – | 40 | 1st | 34 | 31 | 3 | 0 | .912 | Won Quarterfinal series 12–7 (Rensselaer); Lost Semifinal 2–3 (Vermont); Won Third-place game 6–3 (Cornell) | Won Quarterfinal series 9–4 (Lake Superior State); Won Semifinal 4–3 (Michigan State); Won Championship 4–3 (Minnesota) |
| 1989–90 | ECAC Hockey | 22 | 12 | 9 | 1 | – | – | – | 25 | 6th | 28 | 13 | 14 | 1 | .482 | Lost Quarterfinal series 4–10 (Cornell) | |
Ronn Tomassoni (1990–1999)
| 1990–91 | ECAC Hockey | 22 | 13 | 7 | 2 | – | – | – | 28 | T–4th | 29 | 14 | 12 | 3 | .534 | Won Quarterfinal series 10–6 (Rensselaer); Lost Semifinal 2–3 (Clarkson) | |
| 1991–92 | ECAC Hockey | 22 | 13 | 3 | 6 | – | – | – | 32 | 1st | 27 | 14 | 7 | 6 | .630 | Lost Quarterfinal 3–4 (Rensselaer) | |
| 1992–93 | ECAC Hockey | 22 | 16 | 3 | 3 | – | – | – | 35 | 1st | 31 | 22 | 6 | 3 | .758 | Won Quarterfinal series 2–0 (Princeton); Lost Semifinal 1–3 (Brown); Won Third-place game 6–3 (Rensselaer) | Lost Regional Quarterfinal 2–3 (Northern Michigan) |
| 1993–94 | ECAC Hockey | 22 | 16 | 2 | 4 | – | – | – | 36 | 1st | 33 | 24 | 5 | 4 | .788 | Won Quarterfinal series 2–0 (Cornell); Won Semifinal 5–1 (Brown); Won Championship 3–0 (Rensselaer) | Won Regional semifinal 7–1 (New Hampshire); Lost Semifinal 2–3 (Lake Superior State) |
| 1994–95 | ECAC Hockey | 22 | 12 | 9 | 1 | – | – | – | 25 | T–3rd | 30 | 14 | 14 | 2 | .500 | Lost Quarterfinal series 0–1–1 (Rensselaer) | |
| 1995–96 | ECAC Hockey | 22 | 9 | 12 | 1 | – | – | – | 19 | 6th | 34 | 13 | 20 | 1 | .397 | Won Quarterfinal series 2–1 (St. Lawrence); Won Semifinal 4–3 (Vermont); Lost Championship 1–2 (Cornell) | |
| 1996–97 | ECAC Hockey | 22 | 9 | 11 | 2 | – | – | – | 20 | 8th | 32 | 11 | 18 | 3 | .391 | Won Preliminary 4–2 (St. Lawrence); Lost Quarterfinal series 0–1–1 (Cornell) | |
| 1997–98 | ECAC Hockey | 22 | 10 | 11 | 1 | – | – | – | 21 | T–5th | 33 | 14 | 17 | 2 | .455 | Won First round series 2–0 (Colgate); Lost Semifinal 2–6 (Clarkson); Won Third-place game 4–1 (Yale) | |
| 1998–99 | ECAC Hockey | 22 | 8 | 12 | 2 | – | – | – | 18 | 8th | 32 | 14 | 16 | 2 | .469 | Lost First round series 1–2 (Rensselaer) | |
Mark Mazzoleni (1999–2004)
| 1999–2000 | ECAC Hockey | 21 | 9 | 10 | 2 | – | – | – | 20 | T–6th | 30 | 11 | 17 | 2 | .400 | Lost First round series 0–2 (Cornell) | |
| 2000–01 | ECAC Hockey | 22 | 12 | 8 | 2 | – | – | – | 26 | 3rd | 33 | 16 | 15 | 2 | .515 | Won First round series 2–0 (Yale); Lost Semifinal 2–5 (Cornell); Won Third-place game 3–2 (Dartmouth) | |
| 2001–02 | ECAC Hockey | 22 | 10 | 9 | 3 | – | – | – | 23 | T–3rd | 34 | 15 | 15 | 4 | .500 | Won First round series 2–0 (Brown); Won Semifinal 3–2 (Clarkson); Won Championship 4–3 (Cornell) | Lost Regional Quarterfinal 3–4 (Maine) |
| 2002–03 | ECAC Hockey | 22 | 17 | 4 | 1 | – | – | – | 35 | 2nd | 34 | 22 | 10 | 2 | .676 | Won Quarterfinal series 2–0 (Vermont); Won Semifinal 5–3 (Dartmouth); Lost Championship 2–3 (Cornell) | Lost Regional semifinal 4–6 (Boston University) |
| 2003–04 | ECAC Hockey | 22 | 10 | 10 | 2 | – | – | – | 22 | 6th | 36 | 18 | 15 | 3 | .542 | Won First round series 2–0 (Vermont); Won Quarterfinal series 2–0 (Brown); Won Semifinal 2–1 (Dartmouth); Won Championship 4–2 (Clarkson) | Lost Regional semifinal 4–5 (Maine) |
Ted Donato (2004–Present)
| 2004–05 | ECAC Hockey | 22 | 15 | 5 | 2 | – | – | – | 32 | 2nd | 34 | 21 | 10 | 3 | .662 | Won Quarterfinal series 2–0 (St. Lawrence); Won Semifinal 4–3 (Colgate); Lost Championship 1–3 (Cornell) | Lost Regional semifinal 2–3 (New Hampshire) |
| 2005–06 | ECAC Hockey | 22 | 13 | 8 | 1 | – | – | – | 27 | 4th | 35 | 21 | 12 | 2 | .629 | Won Quarterfinal series 2–1 (St. Lawrence); Won Semifinal 10–1 (Dartmouth); Won Championship 6–2 (Cornell) | Lost Regional semifinal 1–6 (Maine) |
| 2006–07 | ECAC Hockey | 22 | 10 | 10 | 2 | – | – | – | 22 | T–6th | 33 | 14 | 17 | 2 | .455 | Won First round series 2–0 (Yale); Lost Quarterfinal series 0–2 (Clarkson) | |
| 2007–08 | ECAC Hockey | 22 | 12 | 7 | 3 | – | – | – | 27 | 3rd | 34 | 17 | 13 | 4 | .559 | Won Quarterfinal series 2–1 (Quinnipiac); Won Semifinal 3–2 (Cornell); Lost Championship 1–4 (Princeton) | |
| 2008–09 | ECAC Hockey | 22 | 9 | 7 | 6 | – | – | – | 24 | T–5th | 31 | 9 | 16 | 6 | .387 | Lost First round series 0–2 (Brown) | |
| 2009–10 | ECAC Hockey | 22 | 7 | 12 | 3 | – | – | – | 17 | T–9th | 33 | 9 | 21 | 3 | .318 | Won First round series 2–0 (Princeton); Lost Quarterfinal series 0–2 (Cornell) | |
| 2010–11 | ECAC Hockey | 22 | 7 | 14 | 1 | – | – | – | 15 | 10th | 34 | 12 | 21 | 1 | .368 | Won First round series 2–0 (Clarkson); Lost Quarterfinal series 1–2 (Dartmouth) | |
| 2011–12 | ECAC Hockey | 22 | 8 | 5 | 9 | – | – | – | 25 | 3rd | 34 | 13 | 10 | 11 | .544 | Won Quarterfinal series 2–1 (Yale); Won Semifinal 6–1 (Cornell); Lost Championship 1–3 (Union) | |
| 2012–13 | ECAC Hockey | 22 | 6 | 14 | 2 | – | – | – | 14 | 12th | 32 | 10 | 19 | 3 | .359 | Lost First round series 1–2 (Dartmouth) | |
| 2013–14 | ECAC Hockey | 22 | 6 | 12 | 4 | – | – | – | 16 | T–10th | 31 | 10 | 17 | 4 | .387 | Lost First round series 0–2 (Yale) | |
| 2014–15 | ECAC Hockey | 22 | 11 | 8 | 3 | – | – | – | 25 | 6th | 37 | 21 | 13 | 3 | .608 | Won First round series 2–0 (Brown); Won Quarterfinal series 2–1 (Yale); Won Semifinal 5–2 (Quinnipiac); Won Championship 4–2 (Colgate) | Lost Regional semifinal 1–4 (Omaha) |
| 2015–16 | ECAC Hockey | 22 | 12 | 6 | 4 | – | – | – | 28 | 3rd | 34 | 19 | 11 | 4 | .618 | Won Quarterfinal series 2–0 (Rensselaer); Won Semifinal 2–1 (St. Lawrence); Lost Championship 1–4 (Quinnipiac) | Lost Regional semifinal 1–4 (Boston College) |
| 2016–17 | ECAC Hockey | 22 | 16 | 4 | 2 | – | – | – | 34 | T–1st | 36 | 28 | 6 | 2 | .806 | Won Quarterfinal series 2–0 (Yale); Won Semifinal 4–1 (Quinnipiac); Won Championship 4–1 (Cornell) | Won Regional semifinal 3–0 (Providence); Won Regional Final 3–2 (Air Force); Lost Semifinal 1–2 (Minnesota–Duluth) |
| 2017–18 | ECAC Hockey | 22 | 11 | 8 | 3 | – | – | – | 25 | 4th | 33 | 15 | 14 | 4 | .515 | Won Quarterfinal series 2–1 (Dartmouth); Lost Semifinal 4–5 (Clarkson) | |
| 2018–19 | ECAC Hockey | 22 | 13 | 7 | 2 | – | – | – | 28 | T–3rd | 33 | 19 | 11 | 3 | .621 | Won Quarterfinal series, 2–0 (Dartmouth); Lost Semifinal 2–5 (Clarkson) | Lost Regional semifinal, 0–4 (Massachusetts) |
| 2019–20 | ECAC Hockey | 22 | 11 | 6 | 5 | – | – | – | 27 | 5th | 31 | 15 | 10 | 6 | .581 | Won First round series, 2–0 (St. Lawrence); Withdrew from Tournament | |
| 2020–21 | ECAC Hockey | Season Cancelled | | | | | | | | | | | | | | | |
| 2021–22 | ECAC Hockey | 22 | 16 | 6 | 2 | 1 | 0 | 2 | 51 | T–2nd | 35 | 21 | 11 | 3 | .643 | Won Quarterfinal series, 2–0 (Rensselaer); Won Semifinal, 5–3 (Clarkson); Won Championship, 3–2 (OT) (Quinnipiac) | Lost Regional semifinal, 3–4 (Minnesota State) |
| 2022–23 | ECAC Hockey | 22 | 18 | 4 | 0 | 5 | 0 | 0 | 49 | 2nd | 34 | 24 | 8 | 2 | .735 | Won Quarterfinal series, 2–0 (Princeton); Won Semifinal, 1–0 (OT) (Cornell); Lost Championship, 2–3 (Colgate) | Lost Regional semifinal, 1–8 (Ohio State) |
| 2023–24 | ECAC Hockey | 22 | 6 | 10 | 6 | 1 | 2 | 3 | 28 | 8th | 32 | 7 | 19 | 6 | .313 | Won First Round, 1–0 (Princeton); Lost Quarterfinal series, 0–2 (Cornell) | |
| 2024–25 | ECAC Hockey | 22 | 9 | 10 | 3 | 2 | 2 | 1 | 31 | 7th | 33 | 13 | 17 | 3 | .439 | Won First Round, 1–0 (Rensselaer); Lost Quarterfinal series, 1–2 (Clarkson) | |
| Totals | | | | | | | | | | | GP | W | L | T | % | Championships | |
| Regular Season | | | | | | | | | | | 2503 | 1417 | 919 | 167 | .599 | 3 Quadrangular Championships, 2 Pentagonal Championships, 3 ECAC Divisional Championship, 11 ECAC Championship | |
| Conference Post-season | | | | | | | | | | | 195 | 125 | 66 | 4 | .651 | 11 ECAC tournament championships | |
| NCAA Post-season | | | | | | | | | | | 52 | 16 | 35 | 1 | .317 | 27 NCAA Tournament appearances | |
| Regular Season and Post-season Record | | | | | | | | | | | 2750 | 1558 | 1020 | 172 | .598 | 17 Intercollegiate Championships, 1 NCAA national championship | |

* Winning percentage is used when conference schedules are unbalanced.
