= Edward Bigelow =

Edward Bigelow may refer to:

- Edward Manning Bigelow (1850–1916), known as the "father of Pittsburgh's parks"
- Edward Bigelow (ice hockey) (1899–1975), American ice hockey player and coach
