= 1920–21 Fordham Rams men's ice hockey season =

- Home ice: 181st Street Ice Palace

Record
- Overall: 3–0–0
- Home: 3–0–0

Coaches and captains
- Head coach: Joe Du Moe
- Captain(s): Ed McGurk

The 1920–21 Fordham Rams men's ice hockey season was the 2nd season of play for the program.

== Season ==
Fordham began the year with a match against Princeton. Though a traditional power, the Tigers had slipped after the war and were vulnerable to the upstart Rams. Fordham also had a distinct home ice advantage in that the 181st Street Ice Palace was not only much smaller than Princeton was used to (causing the game to be played with 6-men teams) but it had pillars set in the ice that had to be avoided during the match while also being played on rough ice. This enabled the Rams to neutralize the speed of the Tigers and win the game with two goals in the second. The Rams used the same advantages against Penn, however, since the Quakers were an inferior team, the score was much more lopsided.

A week later, Fordham continued its torrid pace by taking down the Mass Aggies 8–3. With the Rams primed for a shot at an intercollegiate title, three pending games would determine the teams fate. Unfortunately, it appears none were forthcoming. While Fordham records end in January, no other programs report games against the Rams for the remainder of the season.

Edward Curley served as team manager.

== Roster ==
No.	Nat.	Player	Class	Pos	Height	Weight	DoB	Hometown	Previous team
		Duncan		RW
		Hennessey		G
		Kersey		RW
		McPherson		D
		Edward B. McGurk (C)	Senior	C/LW
		G. Noonan		C/RW
		J. Noonan		D
		Powers		G

== Standings ==
1920–21 College ice hockey standings
	Intercollegiate							Overall					
	GP	W	L	T	Pct.	GF	GA	GP	W	L	T	GF	GA
Amherst	7	0	7	0	.000	8	19	7	0	7	0	8	19
Army	3	0	2	1	.167	6	11	3	0	2	1	6	11
Bates	4	2	2	0	.500	7	8	8	4	4	0	22	20
Boston College	7	6	1	0	.857	27	11	8	6	2	0	28	18
Bowdoin	4	0	3	1	.125	1	10	7	1	5	1	10	23
Buffalo	–	–	–	–	–	–	–	6	0	6	0	–	–
Carnegie Tech	5	0	4	1	.100	4	18	5	0	4	1	4	18
Clarkson	1	0	1	0	.000	1	6	3	2	1	0	12	14
Colgate	4	1	3	0	.250	8	14	5	2	3	0	9	14
Columbia	5	1	4	0	.200	21	24	5	1	4	0	21	24
Cornell	5	3	2	0	.600	22	10	5	3	2	0	22	10
Dartmouth	9	5	3	1	.611	24	21	11	6	4	1	30	27
Fordham	–	–	–	–	–	–	–	–	–	–	–	–	–
Hamilton	–	–	–	–	–	–	–	10	10	0	0	–	–
Harvard	6	6	0	0	1.000	42	3	10	8	2	0	55	8
Massachusetts Agricultural	7	3	4	0	.429	18	17	7	3	4	0	18	17
Michigan College of Mines	2	1	1	0	.500	9	5	10	6	4	0	29	21
MIT	6	3	3	0	.500	13	21	7	3	4	0	16	25
New York State	–	–	–	–	–	–	–	–	–	–	–	–	–
Notre Dame	3	2	1	0	.667	7	9	3	2	1	0	7	9
Pennsylvania	8	3	4	1	.438	17	37	9	3	5	1	18	44
Princeton	7	4	3	0	.571	18	16	8	4	4	0	20	23
Rensselaer	4	1	3	0	.250	7	13	4	1	3	0	7	13
Tufts	–	–	–	–	–	–	–	–	–	–	–	–	–
Williams	5	4	1	0	.800	17	10	6	5	1	0	21	10
Yale	8	3	4	1	.438	21	33	10	3	6	1	25	47
YMCA College	6	5	0	1	.917	17	9	7	5	1	1	20	16

== Schedule and results ==
Date	Opponent	Site	Result	Record
Regular Season
January 8	Princeton*	181st Street Ice Palace • New York, New York	W 2–1	1–0–0
January 22	Pennsylvania*	181st Street Ice Palace • New York, New York	W 15–3	2–0–0
January 29	Massachusetts Agricultural*	181st Street Ice Palace • New York, New York	W 8–3	3–0–0
*Non-conference game.
