= 1917–18 United States collegiate men's ice hockey season =

- Duration: January 1918– February 1918
- Collegiate champion: None

The 1917–18 United States collegiate men's ice hockey season was the 24th season of collegiate ice hockey.

== Regular season ==
Several programs suspended operations due to World War I. Most would return shortly after the war's end.

=== Standings ===
1917–18 Collegiate ice hockey standings
	Intercollegiate							Overall					
	GP	W	L	T	PCT.	GF	GA	GP	W	L	T	GF	GA
Army	3	2	1	0	.667	11	5	9	6	3	0	27	9
Boston College	1	1	0	0	1.000	3	1	3	2	1	0	12	7
Boston University	1	0	1	0	.000	1	3	1	0	1	0	1	3
Dartmouth	3	2	1	0	.667	10	5	6	2	4	0	16	25
Massachusetts Agricultural	8	5	2	1	.688	22	15	8	5	2	1	22	15
Polytechnic Institute of Brooklyn	–	–	–	–	–	–	–	–	–	–	–	–	–
Rensselaer	3	0	2	1	.167	1	19	3	0	2	1	1	19
Tufts	–	–	–	–	–	–	–	4	1	3	0	–	–
Williams	3	2	1	0	.667	19	4	3	2	1	0	19	4
Yale	1	1	0	0	1.000	7	2	1	1	0	0	7	2
YMCA College	–	–	–	–	–	–	–	–	–	–	–	–	–
