= 1918–19 Yale Bulldogs men's ice hockey season =

College ice hockey season

Record
- Overall: 1–1–0
- Neutral: 1–1–0

Coaches and captains
- Captain: David Ingalls

The 1918–19 Yale Bulldogs men's ice hockey season was the 24th season of play for the program.

== Season ==
After the armistice was signed in November 1918, many prospective college students began returning to the US. This allowed many universities to begin restarting their athletic programs. Yale was one of the few teams to have officially existed during the war but, despite that advantage, the Elis still had a great deal of difficulty in the spring semester. The agreement with the New Haven Arena had ended and the Bulldogs no longer had a permanent home. Additionally, many schools were not ready to field teams until February at the earliest, and even then only a few games were scheduled for most programs.

As a consequence, Yale played just two games during the season. They were, however, against the Elis' two biggest rivals at the time, providing some measure of normalcy for the student body.

With so few games, the team did not employ a coach for the season. As of 2020 this is the final season in which the Bulldogs did not have an official head coach. E. Harvey Cushing served as team manager instead.

== Roster ==
No.	Nat.	Player	Class	Pos	Height	Weight	DoB	Hometown	Previous team
		Robert Carson III	Sophomore	C	5' 5" (1.65 m)	125 lb (57 kg)
		Lawrence Foster	Sophomore	LW
	(United States)	David S. Ingalls (C)	Junior	C/R	6' 0" (1.83 m)	170 lb (77 kg)	1899-01-28	Cleveland, Ohio	St. Paul's School
		Howard M. Newton	Graduate	G
		Malcolm Oakes	Junior	C
		Victor Poindexter	Junior	G	5' 10" (1.78 m)	145 lb (66 kg)
		Joseph W. Sargent	Junior	RW	5' 10.5" (1.79 m)	150 lb (68 kg)
	(United States)	Nelson J. Smith	Junior	D	5' 9" (1.75 m)	150 lb (68 kg)		Syracuse, New York
		Clarence S. Walton	Senior	LW	5' 9" (1.75 m)	165 lb (75 kg)
		W. Welles	Junior	D
		C. Williams	Junior	RW
	(United States)	Douglas R. Wilson	Junior	D	5' 7.5" (1.71 m)	140 lb (64 kg)	1898-01-26

== Standings ==
1918–19 Collegiate ice hockey standings
	Intercollegiate							Overall					
	GP	W	L	T	PCT.	GF	GA	GP	W	L	T	GF	GA
Army	2	0	2	0	.000	2	6	5	1	4	0	4	9
Assumption	–	–	–	–	–	–	–	–	–	–	–	–	–
Boston College	2	1	1	0	.500	7	9	3	2	1	0	10	9
Hamilton	–	–	–	–	–	–	–	2	1	0	1	–	–
Harvard	3	3	0	0	1.000	18	5	7	7	0	0	31	10
Massachusetts Agricultural	3	1	0	2	.667	2	0	3	1	0	2	2	0
Princeton	2	0	2	0	.000	3	13	2	0	2	0	3	13
Rensselaer	1	0	1	0	.000	1	4	0	0	1	0	1	4
Williams	1	0	1	0	.000	0	2	1	0	1	0	0	2
Yale	2	1	1	0	.500	7	5	2	1	1	0	7	5
YMCA College	–	–	–	–	–	–	–	–	–	–	–	–	–

== Schedule and results ==
Date	Opponent	Site	Result	Record
Regular season
February 8	vs. Harvard*	Brooklyn Ice Palace • Brooklyn, New York (Rivalry)	L 1–4	0–1–0
February 15	vs. Princeton*	Brooklyn Ice Palace • Brooklyn, New York	W 6–1	1–1–0
*Non-conference game.
