= 1917–18 RPI men's ice hockey season =

- Conference: Independent

Record
- Overall: 0–2–1
- Home: 0–1–1
- Road: 0–1–0

Coaches and captains
- Head coach: Leroy Clark
- Captain: Walter Johnson

The 1917–18 RPI men's ice hockey season was the 15th season of play for the program.

== Season ==
Note: Rensselaer's athletic teams were unofficially known as 'Cherry and White' until 1921 when the Engineers moniker debuted for the men's basketball team.

== Roster ==
No.	Nat.	Player	Class	Pos	Height	Weight	DoB	Hometown	Previous team
		Walter Johnson (C)

== Standings ==
1917–18 Collegiate ice hockey standings
	Intercollegiate							Overall					
	GP	W	L	T	PCT.	GF	GA	GP	W	L	T	GF	GA
Army	3	2	1	0	.667	11	5	9	6	3	0	27	9
Boston College	1	1	0	0	1.000	3	1	3	2	1	0	12	7
Boston University	1	0	1	0	.000	1	3	1	0	1	0	1	3
Dartmouth	3	2	1	0	.667	10	5	6	2	4	0	16	25
Massachusetts Agricultural	8	5	2	1	.688	22	15	8	5	2	1	22	15
Polytechnic Institute of Brooklyn	–	–	–	–	–	–	–	–	–	–	–	–	–
Rensselaer	3	0	2	1	.167	1	19	3	0	2	1	1	19
Tufts	–	–	–	–	–	–	–	4	1	3	0	–	–
Williams	3	2	1	0	.667	19	4	3	2	1	0	19	4
Yale	1	1	0	0	1.000	7	2	1	1	0	0	7	2
YMCA College	–	–	–	–	–	–	–	–	–	–	–	–	–

== Schedule and results ==
Date	Opponent	Site	Result	Record
Regular Season
January 5	at Williams*	Weston Field Rink • Williamstown, Massachusetts	L 0–14	0–1–0
January 12	Massachusetts Agricultural*	RPI Rink • Troy, New York	T 0–0	0–1–1
January 19	YMCA College*	RPI Rink • Troy, New York	L 1–5	0–2–1
*Non-conference game.
