= 1917–18 Yale Bulldogs men's ice hockey season =

College ice hockey season

Record
- Overall: 1–0–0
- Road: 1–0–0

Coaches and captains
- Captain: Lester Armour

The 1917–18 Yale Bulldogs men's ice hockey season was the 23rd season of play for the program.

== Season ==
With many of the University's students having left to join the military for the Great War, Yale only fielded an informal team. The team was attached to the school's ROTC and possessed none of the regulars from the previous year. Lester Armour was elected team captain at the end of the previous season, but as he did not play during this season that title was only honorific.

Predictably, Yale had difficulty scheduling games and would play only a single game all season. They visited YMCA College in early February, winning 7–2 with four players from last season's championship freshman team on the roster.

Yale would eventually recognize the 1917–18 team as an official representative of the university, which allowed the program to claim an uninterrupted existence since 1895–96.

== Roster ==
No.	Nat.	Player	Class	Pos	Height	Weight	DoB	Hometown	Previous team
		Boyd		LW
		Andrew J. Fox Jr.	Junior	C
		H. Hubbard		D
		Victor Poindexter	Sophomore	G	5' 10" (1.78 m)	145 lb (66 kg)
		Joseph W. Sargent	Sophomore	RW	5' 10.5" (1.79 m)	150 lb (68 kg)
	(United States)	Nelson J. Smith	Sophomore	D	5' 9" (1.75 m)	150 lb (68 kg)		Syracuse, New York
		Douglas R. Wilson	Sophomore	D	5' 7.5" (1.71 m)	140 lb (64 kg)	1898-01-26

== Standings ==
1917–18 Collegiate ice hockey standings
	Intercollegiate							Overall					
	GP	W	L	T	PCT.	GF	GA	GP	W	L	T	GF	GA
Army	3	2	1	0	.667	11	5	9	6	3	0	27	9
Boston College	1	1	0	0	1.000	3	1	3	2	1	0	12	7
Boston University	1	0	1	0	.000	1	3	1	0	1	0	1	3
Dartmouth	3	2	1	0	.667	10	5	6	2	4	0	16	25
Massachusetts Agricultural	8	5	2	1	.688	22	15	8	5	2	1	22	15
Polytechnic Institute of Brooklyn	–	–	–	–	–	–	–	–	–	–	–	–	–
Rensselaer	3	0	2	1	.167	1	19	3	0	2	1	1	19
Tufts	–	–	–	–	–	–	–	4	1	3	0	–	–
Williams	3	2	1	0	.667	19	4	3	2	1	0	19	4
Yale	1	1	0	0	1.000	7	2	1	1	0	0	7	2
YMCA College	–	–	–	–	–	–	–	–	–	–	–	–	–

== Schedule and results ==
Date	Opponent	Site	Result	Record
Regular season
February 9	at YMCA College*	Springfield, Massachusetts	W 7–2	1–0–0
*Non-conference game.
