= 1917–18 Army Cadets men's ice hockey season =

- Conference: Independent
- Home ice: Stuart Rink

Record
- Overall: 6–3–0

Coaches and captains
- Head coach: Joseph Viner
- Captain: Henry Nichols

The US 1917–18 Army Cadets men's ice hockey season was the 15th season of play for the program.

== Season ==
During World War I the team brought back former team captain and then-army Captain Joseph Viner to lead the team. Due to the requirements of the war, many students who were close to graduating were pressed into service as student officers in 1917. This had a secondary effect of depleting the ice hockey team of much of its experience. As a result, sophomore cadet Henry Nichols was named captain.

Because of the war, many of Army's contemporaries had suspended their programs and left the program scrambling to fill its schedule. The team ended up playing as many secondary schools as colleges, finishing with a 6–3 mark.

== Roster ==
No.	Nat.	Player	Class	Pos	Height	Weight	DoB	Hometown	Previous team
	(United States)	Henry B. Nichols (C)	Sophomore	G			1897-03-01	Connecticut

== Standings ==
1917–18 Collegiate ice hockey standings
	Intercollegiate							Overall					
	GP	W	L	T	PCT.	GF	GA	GP	W	L	T	GF	GA
Army	3	2	1	0	.667	11	5	9	6	3	0	27	9
Boston College	1	1	0	0	1.000	3	1	3	2	1	0	12	7
Boston University	1	0	1	0	.000	1	3	1	0	1	0	1	3
Dartmouth	3	2	1	0	.667	10	5	6	2	4	0	16	25
Massachusetts Agricultural	8	5	2	1	.688	22	15	8	5	2	1	22	15
Polytechnic Institute of Brooklyn	–	–	–	–	–	–	–	–	–	–	–	–	–
Rensselaer	3	0	2	1	.167	1	19	3	0	2	1	1	19
Tufts	–	–	–	–	–	–	–	4	1	3	0	–	–
Williams	3	2	1	0	.667	19	4	3	2	1	0	19	4
Yale	1	1	0	0	1.000	7	2	1	1	0	0	7	2
YMCA College	–	–	–	–	–	–	–	–	–	–	–	–	–

== Schedule and results ==
Date	Opponent	Site	Result	Record
Regular Season
	Brooklyn Polytechnic Institute*	Stuart Rink • West Point, New York	W 7–0	1–0–0
	Flushing High School*	Stuart Rink • West Point, New York	L 0–1	1–1–0
	New York Military Academy*	Stuart Rink • West Point, New York	W 8–1	2–1–0
	Princeton †*	Stuart Rink • West Point, New York	L 0–1	2–2–0
January 26	Williams*	Stuart Rink • West Point, New York	L 2–4	2–3–0
	Jamaica High School*	Stuart Rink • West Point, New York	W 4–0	3–3–0
	Erasmus Hall High School*	Stuart Rink • West Point, New York	W 2–0	4–3–0
February 2	Massachusetts Agricultural*	Stuart Rink • West Point, New York	W 2–1	5–3–0
	Camp Upton*	Stuart Rink • West Point, New York	W 2–1	6–3–0
*Non-conference game.

† The Princeton squad was an informal team supported by students and did not officially represent the university in any capacity.
