= 1917–18 Dartmouth men's ice hockey season =

- Conference: Independent
- Home ice: Occom Pond

Record
- Overall: 2–4–0
- Home: 1–1–0
- Road: 1–3–0

Coaches and captains
- Head coach: John Murphy
- Captain: John Murphy

The 1917–18 Dartmouth men's ice hockey season was the 13th season of play for the program.

== Season ==
Unlike most programs, Dartmouth continued to field a team throughout the duration of World War I. The team did, however, suffer as a result of the war, with many potential players not attending college for the 1917–18 term. Team captain John Murphy also served as the team's coach, though this was in an unofficial capacity as he wasn't employed by the university.

Note: Dartmouth College did not possess a moniker for its athletic teams until the 1920s, however, the university had adopted 'Dartmouth Green' as its school color in 1866.

== Roster ==
No.	Nat.	Player	Class	Pos	Height	Weight	DoB	Hometown	Previous team
	(United States)	Chester O. Gale	Junior	G			1896-09-27	Warren, Pennsylvania
	(United States)	John H. Murphy (C)	Junior	F				Malden, Massachusetts

== Standings ==
1917–18 Collegiate ice hockey standings
	Intercollegiate							Overall					
	GP	W	L	T	PCT.	GF	GA	GP	W	L	T	GF	GA
Army	3	2	1	0	.667	11	5	9	6	3	0	27	9
Boston College	1	1	0	0	1.000	3	1	3	2	1	0	12	7
Boston University	1	0	1	0	.000	1	3	1	0	1	0	1	3
Dartmouth	3	2	1	0	.667	10	5	6	2	4	0	16	25
Massachusetts Agricultural	8	5	2	1	.688	22	15	8	5	2	1	22	15
Polytechnic Institute of Brooklyn	–	–	–	–	–	–	–	–	–	–	–	–	–
Rensselaer	3	0	2	1	.167	1	19	3	0	2	1	1	19
Tufts	–	–	–	–	–	–	–	4	1	3	0	–	–
Williams	3	2	1	0	.667	19	4	3	2	1	0	19	4
Yale	1	1	0	0	1.000	7	2	1	1	0	0	7	2
YMCA College	–	–	–	–	–	–	–	–	–	–	–	–	–

== Schedule and results ==
Date	Opponent	Site	Result	Record
Regular Season
January 19	Tufts*	Occom Pond • Hanover, New Hampshire	W 5–0	1–0–0
February 1	at Pittsburgh Athletic Association*	Duquesne Garden • Pittsburgh, Pennsylvania	L 0–8	1–1–0
February 2	at Pittsburgh Athletic Association*	Duquesne Garden • Pittsburgh, Pennsylvania	L 5–7	1–2–0
February 9	at Massachusetts Agricultural*	Alumni Field Rink • Amherst, Massachusetts	W 3–0	2–2–0
February 16	Massachusetts Agricultural*	Occom Pond • Hanover, New Hampshire	L 2–5	2–3–0
February 22	at St. Paul's School*	St. Paul's Rink • Concord, New Hampshire	L 1–5	2–4–0
*Non-conference game.
