= 1918–19 Princeton Tigers men's ice hockey season =

College ice hockey season

- Home ice: Lake Carnegie

Record
- Overall: 0–2–0
- Neutral: 0–2–0

Coaches and captains
- Head coach: Ehric Kilner; Grant Peacock
- Assistant coaches: Rolland Peacock; LaMotte Cohu
- Captain: Francis Rue

The 1918–19 Princeton Tigers men's ice hockey season was the 19th season of play for the program.

== Season ==
After the armistice was signed in November, the university began preparing to receive students for the spring semester. The slow return allowed Princeton to restart many of its athletic programs, including the ice hockey team. There was a predictable delay before the team was formed and able to play its first game, but an agreement was reached with Harvard and Yale where each squad would play the other two.

Princeton's first game came against the St. Nicholas Hockey Club with the Tigers taking an early lead. After the opposing captain was injured and was forced to leave the game, Princeton agreed to play the remainder of the contest 6-on-6. The speed of St. Nicholas allowed them to carry the play for the balance of the game and finish with a 6–4 victory over Princeton. After losing a close practice game against the Brooklyn Hockey Club, Princeton was outplayed by Yale in a 1–6 loss.

The final game was a route at the hands of Harvard with the Crimson winning 7–2. Princeton played well in their few games but were hampered by a lack of practice time and experience.

== Roster ==
| No. | Nat. | Player | Class | Pos | Height | Weight | DoB | Hometown | Previous team |
|---|---|---|---|---|---|---|---|---|---|
| | | Richard A. Haight | Sophomore | D |
| | | Edward L. Keyes | Sophomore | C/LW |
| | | Alan G. Knox | Sophomore | W |
| | (United States) | Frederic W. Lincoln IV | Sophomore | W | | | 1898-10-15 | New York, New York |
| | | George Piper | Sophomore | G |
| | | Thomas Raleigh | Junior | R |
| | | Thomas C. Roberts | Sophomore | RW |
| | | Francis J. Rue (C) | Senior | D |
| | | Walker Taylor | Junior | G |
| | | John Wintersteen | Senior | C/RW |

== Standings ==
1918–19 Collegiate ice hockey standings
| | Intercollegiate | | | | | | | Overall | | | | | |
| | GP | W | L | T | PCT. | GF | GA | GP | W | L | T | GF | GA |
|---|---|---|---|---|---|---|---|---|---|---|---|---|---|
| Army | 2 | 0 | 2 | 0 | .000 | 2 | 6 | 5 | 1 | 4 | 0 | 4 | 9 |
| Assumption | – | – | – | – | – | – | – | – | – | – | – | – | – |
| Boston College | 2 | 1 | 1 | 0 | .500 | 7 | 9 | 3 | 2 | 1 | 0 | 10 | 9 |
| Hamilton | – | – | – | – | – | – | – | 2 | 1 | 0 | 1 | – | – |
| Harvard | 3 | 3 | 0 | 0 | 1.000 | 18 | 5 | 7 | 7 | 0 | 0 | 31 | 10 |
| Massachusetts Agricultural | 3 | 1 | 0 | 2 | .667 | 2 | 0 | 3 | 1 | 0 | 2 | 2 | 0 |
| Princeton | 2 | 0 | 2 | 0 | .000 | 3 | 13 | 2 | 0 | 2 | 0 | 3 | 13 |
| Rensselaer | 1 | 0 | 1 | 0 | .000 | 1 | 4 | 0 | 0 | 1 | 0 | 1 | 4 |
| Williams | 1 | 0 | 1 | 0 | .000 | 0 | 2 | 1 | 0 | 1 | 0 | 0 | 2 |
| Yale | 2 | 1 | 1 | 0 | .500 | 7 | 5 | 2 | 1 | 1 | 0 | 7 | 5 |
| YMCA College | – | – | – | – | – | – | – | – | – | – | – | – | – |

== Schedule and results ==
| Date | Opponent | Site | Result | Record |
Regular Season
| February 8 | vs. St. Nicholas Hockey Club* | Newark Ice Rink • Newark, New Jersey (Exhibition) | L 4–6 | |
| February 15 | vs. Yale* | Brooklyn Ice Palace • Brooklyn, New York | L 1–6 | 0–1–0 |
| February 22 | vs. Harvard* | Brooklyn Ice Palace • Brooklyn, New York | L 2–7 | 0–2–0 |
*Non-conference game.

== Scoring Statistics ==
| Name | Position | Games | Goals |
|---|---|---|---|
| John Wintersteen | C/RW | 2 | 2 |
| Alan Knox | W | 2 | 1 |
| George Piper | G | 1 | 0 |
| Thomas Roberts | RW | 1 | 0 |
| Walker Taylor | G | 1 | 0 |
| Richard Haight | D | 2 | 0 |
| Edward Keyes | C/LW | 2 | 0 |
| Frederic Lincoln | W | 2 | 0 |
| Thomas Raleigh | R | 2 | 0 |
| Francis Rue | D | 2 | 0 |
| Total | | | 3 |

Note: Assists were not recorded as a statistic.
