= 1918–19 Boston College men's ice hockey season =

Hockey season

- Conference: Independent

Record
- Overall: 2–1–0
- Road: 1–0–0
- Neutral: 1–1–0

Coaches and captains
- Head coach: Bob Fowler
- Captain: Walter Falvey

The 1918–19 Boston College men's ice hockey season was the 2nd season of play for the program.

== Season ==
With the end of World War I coming in November 1918, some colleges restarted their ice hockey programs. Even them, most only played a handful of games so the young program at Boston College was still only able to schedule three matches. The highlight for the year was BC's first match against the top program from Harvard. Because the Boston Arena had been damaged by a fire just before the season began, the teams were forced to play at the much smaller Charlesbank Rink.

Note: Boston College's athletic programs weren't known as the 'Eagles' until 1920.

== Roster ==
| No. | Nat. | Player | Class | Pos | Height | Weight | DoB | Hometown | Previous team |
|---|---|---|---|---|---|---|---|---|---|
| | (United States) | Philip Corrigan | | | | | 1898-04-28 | Dorchester, Massachusetts |
| | (United States) | Thomas Dooley | | | | | | Brookline, Massachusetts |
| | (United States) | Walter Falvey (C) | | | | | | Brighton, Massachusetts |
| | (United States) | Bernard Healey | | | | | | Brookline, Massachusetts |
| | (United States) | Don McCluskey | | G | | | | Dorchester, Massachusetts |
| | (United States) | Frank Morrissey | Sophomore | | | | 1899-03-11 | Medford, Massachusetts |
| | (United States) | James Morrissey | | | | | | Medford, Massachusetts |
| | (United States) | Edmund O'Brien | | G | | | | Cambridge, Massachusetts |
| | (United States) | Florence O'Connell | | G | | | | Arlington, Massachusetts |
| | (United States) | John White | | | | | | Forest Hills, Massachusetts |

== Standings ==
1918–19 Collegiate ice hockey standings
| | Intercollegiate | | | | | | | Overall | | | | | |
| | GP | W | L | T | PCT. | GF | GA | GP | W | L | T | GF | GA |
|---|---|---|---|---|---|---|---|---|---|---|---|---|---|
| Army | 2 | 0 | 2 | 0 | .000 | 2 | 6 | 5 | 1 | 4 | 0 | 4 | 9 |
| Assumption | – | – | – | – | – | – | – | – | – | – | – | – | – |
| Boston College | 2 | 1 | 1 | 0 | .500 | 7 | 9 | 3 | 2 | 1 | 0 | 10 | 9 |
| Hamilton | – | – | – | – | – | – | – | 2 | 1 | 0 | 1 | – | – |
| Harvard | 3 | 3 | 0 | 0 | 1.000 | 18 | 5 | 7 | 7 | 0 | 0 | 31 | 10 |
| Massachusetts Agricultural | 3 | 1 | 0 | 2 | .667 | 2 | 0 | 3 | 1 | 0 | 2 | 2 | 0 |
| Princeton | 2 | 0 | 2 | 0 | .000 | 3 | 13 | 2 | 0 | 2 | 0 | 3 | 13 |
| Rensselaer | 1 | 0 | 1 | 0 | .000 | 1 | 4 | 0 | 0 | 1 | 0 | 1 | 4 |
| Williams | 1 | 0 | 1 | 0 | .000 | 0 | 2 | 1 | 0 | 1 | 0 | 0 | 2 |
| Yale | 2 | 1 | 1 | 0 | .500 | 7 | 5 | 2 | 1 | 1 | 0 | 7 | 5 |
| YMCA College | – | – | – | – | – | – | – | – | – | – | – | – | – |

== Schedule and results ==
| Date | Opponent | Site | Result | Record |
Regular Season
| ? | vs. Commonwealth Pier* | Burroughs Pond • Newton, Massachusetts | W 3–0 | 1–0–0 |
| January 31 | vs. Harvard* | Charlesbank Rink • Brighton, Massachusetts | L 2–7 | 1–1–0 |
| February 11 | at Army* | Lusk Reservoir • West Point, New York | W 5–2 | 2–1–0 |
*Non-conference game.
