= 1917–18 Massachusetts Agricultural Aggies men's ice hockey season =

- Home ice: Alumni Field Rink

Record
- Overall: 5–2–1
- Home: 2–1–0
- Road: 3–1–1

Coaches and captains
- Head coach: Elton Mansell
- Captain: Robert Chisholm

The 1917–18 Massachusetts Agricultural Aggies men's ice hockey season was the 10th season of play for the program.

== Roster ==
| No. | Nat. | Player | Class | Pos | Height | Weight | DoB | Hometown | Previous team |
|---|---|---|---|---|---|---|---|---|---|
| | | Robert D. Chisholm (C) | Senior |
| | | Herbert Collins | Freshman |
| | (United States) | John J. Lyons Jr. | Freshman | | | | | Arlington, Massachusetts |
| | | Elton J. Mansell | Junior |
| | (United States) | Justin J. McCarthy (C) | Freshman | | | | 1899-01-25 | Arlington, Massachusetts |
| | | Philip S. Newell | Sophomore |
| | | Harold W. Poole | Senior |
| | | Donald H. Smith | Sophomore |
| | | John D. Snow | Sophomore |

== Standings ==
1917–18 Collegiate ice hockey standings
| | Intercollegiate | | | | | | | Overall | | | | | |
| | GP | W | L | T | PCT. | GF | GA | GP | W | L | T | GF | GA |
|---|---|---|---|---|---|---|---|---|---|---|---|---|---|
| Army | 3 | 2 | 1 | 0 | .667 | 11 | 5 | 9 | 6 | 3 | 0 | 27 | 9 |
| Boston College | 1 | 1 | 0 | 0 | 1.000 | 3 | 1 | 3 | 2 | 1 | 0 | 12 | 7 |
| Boston University | 1 | 0 | 1 | 0 | .000 | 1 | 3 | 1 | 0 | 1 | 0 | 1 | 3 |
| Dartmouth | 3 | 2 | 1 | 0 | .667 | 10 | 5 | 6 | 2 | 4 | 0 | 16 | 25 |
| Massachusetts Agricultural | 8 | 5 | 2 | 1 | .688 | 22 | 15 | 8 | 5 | 2 | 1 | 22 | 15 |
| Polytechnic Institute of Brooklyn | – | – | – | – | – | – | – | – | – | – | – | – | – |
| Rensselaer | 3 | 0 | 2 | 1 | .167 | 1 | 19 | 3 | 0 | 2 | 1 | 1 | 19 |
| Tufts | – | – | – | – | – | – | – | 4 | 1 | 3 | 0 | – | – |
| Williams | 3 | 2 | 1 | 0 | .667 | 19 | 4 | 3 | 2 | 1 | 0 | 19 | 4 |
| Yale | 1 | 1 | 0 | 0 | 1.000 | 7 | 2 | 1 | 1 | 0 | 0 | 7 | 2 |
| YMCA College | – | – | – | – | – | – | – | – | – | – | – | – | – |

== Schedule and results ==
| Date | Opponent | Site | Result | Record |
Regular Season
| January 12 | at Rensselaer* | RPI Rink • Troy, New York | T 0–0 | 0–0–1 |
| January 19 | at Williams* | Weston Field Rink • Williamstown, Massachusetts | W 2–1 ^{OT} | 1–0–1 |
| January 22 | at YMCA College* | Pratt Field Rink • Springfield, Massachusetts | W 6–4 | 2–0–1 |
| January 26 | Tufts* | Alumni Field Rink • Amherst, Massachusetts | W 3–0 | 3–0–1 |
| February 2 | at Army* | Stuart Rink • West Point, New York | L 1–2 | 3–1–1 |
| February 9 | Dartmouth* | Alumni Field Rink • Amherst, Massachusetts | L 0–3 | 3–2–1 |
| February 16 | at Dartmouth* | Occom Pond • Hanover, New Hampshire | W 5–2 | 4–2–1 |
| February 23 | YMCA College* | Alumni Field Rink • Amherst, Massachusetts | W 5–3 | 5–2–1 |
*Non-conference game.
