= 1918–19 RPI men's ice hockey season =

- Conference: Independent

Record
- Overall: 0–1–0
- Home: 0–1–0

Coaches and captains
- Head coach: Leroy Clark
- Captain(s): Richard Cook; Lyman Smith

The 1918–19 RPI men's ice hockey season was the 16th season of play for the program.

== Season ==
Note: Rensselaer's athletic teams were unofficially known as 'Cherry and White' until 1921 when the Engineers moniker debuted for the men's basketball team.

== Roster ==
No.	Nat.	Player	Class	Pos	Height	Weight	DoB	Hometown	Previous team
		Richard Cook (C)
		Lyman Smith (C)

== Standings ==
1918–19 Collegiate ice hockey standings
	Intercollegiate							Overall					
	GP	W	L	T	PCT.	GF	GA	GP	W	L	T	GF	GA
Army	2	0	2	0	.000	2	6	5	1	4	0	4	9
Assumption	–	–	–	–	–	–	–	–	–	–	–	–	–
Boston College	2	1	1	0	.500	7	9	3	2	1	0	10	9
Hamilton	–	–	–	–	–	–	–	2	1	0	1	–	–
Harvard	3	3	0	0	1.000	18	5	7	7	0	0	31	10
Massachusetts Agricultural	3	1	0	2	.667	2	0	3	1	0	2	2	0
Princeton	2	0	2	0	.000	3	13	2	0	2	0	3	13
Rensselaer	1	0	1	0	.000	1	4	0	0	1	0	1	4
Williams	1	0	1	0	.000	0	2	1	0	1	0	0	2
Yale	2	1	1	0	.500	7	5	2	1	1	0	7	5
YMCA College	–	–	–	–	–	–	–	–	–	–	–	–	–

== Schedule and results ==
Date	Opponent	Site	Result	Record
Regular Season
February 1	at YMCA College*	Troy, New York	L 1–4	0–1–0
*Non-conference game.
