= 1918–19 Massachusetts Agricultural Aggies men's ice hockey season =

- Home ice: Alumni Field Rink

Record
- Overall: 1–0–2
- Home: 1–0–2

Coaches and captains
- Head coach: Elton Mansell
- Captain: Robert Chisholm

The 1918–19 Massachusetts Agricultural Aggies men's ice hockey season was the 11th season of play for the program.

== Roster ==
No.	Nat.	Player	Class	Pos	Height	Weight	DoB	Hometown	Previous team
		Henry V. Allen	Sophomore
		Robert D. Chisholm (C)	Graduate
		Gordon B. Crafts	Junior				1896-12-27
		Paul Faxon	Senior
		Ralph G. Leavitt	Sophomore
	(United States)	Justin J. McCarthy	Sophomore	RW			1899-01-25	Arlington, Massachusetts
		George K. Redding	Junior

== Standings ==
1918–19 Collegiate ice hockey standings
	Intercollegiate							Overall					
	GP	W	L	T	PCT.	GF	GA	GP	W	L	T	GF	GA
Army	2	0	2	0	.000	2	6	5	1	4	0	4	9
Assumption	–	–	–	–	–	–	–	–	–	–	–	–	–
Boston College	2	1	1	0	.500	7	9	3	2	1	0	10	9
Hamilton	–	–	–	–	–	–	–	2	1	0	1	–	–
Harvard	3	3	0	0	1.000	18	5	7	7	0	0	31	10
Massachusetts Agricultural	3	1	0	2	.667	2	0	3	1	0	2	2	0
Princeton	2	0	2	0	.000	3	13	2	0	2	0	3	13
Rensselaer	1	0	1	0	.000	1	4	0	0	1	0	1	4
Williams	1	0	1	0	.000	0	2	1	0	1	0	0	2
Yale	2	1	1	0	.500	7	5	2	1	1	0	7	5
YMCA College	–	–	–	–	–	–	–	–	–	–	–	–	–

== Schedule and results ==
Date	Opponent	Site	Result	Record
Regular Season
January 18	at YMCA College*	Pratt Field Rink • Springfield, Massachusetts	T 0–0	0–0–1
February 1	Williams*	Alumni Field Rink • Amherst, Massachusetts	W 2–0	1–0–1
February 19	at Assumption*	Worcester, Massachusetts	T 0–0 ^{2OT}	1–0–2
*Non-conference game.
