= 1917–18 Boston University men's ice hockey season =

- Conference: Independent
- Home ice: Boston Arena

Record
- Overall: 0–1–0
- Neutral: 0–1–0

Coaches and captains
- Head coach: Edgar Burkhardt
- Captain: Nelson Jost

The 1917–18 Boston University men's ice hockey season was the inaugural season of play for the program.

== Season ==
During World War I, Boston University agreed to play cross-town rival Boston College in a game of ice hockey. It was the first official game for the program but, because of the war, the team would not play another contest until 1920.

Note: Boston University's athletic programs weren't known as the 'Terriers' until 1922.

== Roster ==
| No. | Nat. | Player | Class | Pos | Height | Weight | DoB | Hometown | Previous team |
|---|---|---|---|---|---|---|---|---|---|
| | | Luther Bennett |
| | | Nelson Jost (C) |
| | | Harold Leatherbee |
| | | Vincent Morton |
| | | John O'Hare |
| | | Warren Pond |
| | | Paul Rasmussen |

== Standings ==
1917–18 Collegiate ice hockey standings
| | Intercollegiate | | | | | | | Overall | | | | | |
| | GP | W | L | T | PCT. | GF | GA | GP | W | L | T | GF | GA |
|---|---|---|---|---|---|---|---|---|---|---|---|---|---|
| Army | 3 | 2 | 1 | 0 | .667 | 11 | 5 | 9 | 6 | 3 | 0 | 27 | 9 |
| Boston College | 1 | 1 | 0 | 0 | 1.000 | 3 | 1 | 3 | 2 | 1 | 0 | 12 | 7 |
| Boston University | 1 | 0 | 1 | 0 | .000 | 1 | 3 | 1 | 0 | 1 | 0 | 1 | 3 |
| Dartmouth | 3 | 2 | 1 | 0 | .667 | 10 | 5 | 6 | 2 | 4 | 0 | 16 | 25 |
| Massachusetts Agricultural | 8 | 5 | 2 | 1 | .688 | 22 | 15 | 8 | 5 | 2 | 1 | 22 | 15 |
| Polytechnic Institute of Brooklyn | – | – | – | – | – | – | – | – | – | – | – | – | – |
| Rensselaer | 3 | 0 | 2 | 1 | .167 | 1 | 19 | 3 | 0 | 2 | 1 | 1 | 19 |
| Tufts | – | – | – | – | – | – | – | 4 | 1 | 3 | 0 | – | – |
| Williams | 3 | 2 | 1 | 0 | .667 | 19 | 4 | 3 | 2 | 1 | 0 | 19 | 4 |
| Yale | 1 | 1 | 0 | 0 | 1.000 | 7 | 2 | 1 | 1 | 0 | 0 | 7 | 2 |
| YMCA College | – | – | – | – | – | – | – | – | – | – | – | – | – |

== Schedule and results ==
| Date | Opponent | Site | Result | Record |
Regular Season
| February 6 | vs. Boston College* | Boston Arena • Boston, Massachusetts | L 1–3 | 0–1–0 |
*Non-conference game.
