= 1918–19 Army Cadets men's ice hockey season =

- Conference: Independent
- Home ice: Lusk Reservoir

Record
- Overall: 1–4–0
- Home: 1–4–0

Coaches and captains
- Head coach: Philip Day
- Captain: Henry Nichols

The 1918–19 Army Cadets men's ice hockey season was the 16th season of play for the program.

== Season ==
With World War I having ended in November, many students who had graduated early returned to West Point to finish their studies. Among these was Henry Nichols, who returned for a second season as the captain of the ice hockey team and helped the squad transition into the post-war years. Additionally, the team was again coached by a young officer, this time by Philip Day.

Because of how recent the end of the war was at the start of the season, many programs played a partial schedule if any at all. Army, however, was able to put together a slate of 9 games. Unfortunately, before the first match occurred, warm weather rendered Stuart Rink unusable and the team was forced back onto Lusk Reservoir. Even that didn't stop several matches from being cancelled, including the much-anticipated meetings with Yale and Princeton. To make matters worse, Nichols was ruled medically unfit to play and had to watch from the sidelines as his team struggled through the season. He was replaced in goal by Henry Burgard, who played aptly but could not help the Cadets' anemic offense.

== Roster ==
No.	Nat.	Player	Class	Pos	Height	Weight	DoB	Hometown	Previous team
	(United States)	Henry B. Nichols (C)	Junior	G			1897-03-01	Connecticut

== Standings ==
1918–19 Collegiate ice hockey standings
	Intercollegiate							Overall					
	GP	W	L	T	PCT.	GF	GA	GP	W	L	T	GF	GA
Army	2	0	2	0	.000	2	6	5	1	4	0	4	9
Assumption	–	–	–	–	–	–	–	–	–	–	–	–	–
Boston College	2	1	1	0	.500	7	9	3	2	1	0	10	9
Hamilton	–	–	–	–	–	–	–	2	1	0	1	–	–
Harvard	3	3	0	0	1.000	18	5	7	7	0	0	31	10
Massachusetts Agricultural	3	1	0	2	.667	2	0	3	1	0	2	2	0
Princeton	2	0	2	0	.000	3	13	2	0	2	0	3	13
Rensselaer	1	0	1	0	.000	1	4	0	0	1	0	1	4
Williams	1	0	1	0	.000	0	2	1	0	1	0	0	2
Yale	2	1	1	0	.500	7	5	2	1	1	0	7	5
YMCA College	–	–	–	–	–	–	–	–	–	–	–	–	–

== Schedule and results ==
Date	Opponent	Site	Result	Record
Regular Season
January 11	Brooklyn Hockey Club*	Lusk Reservoir • West Point, New York	L 0–1	0–1–0
February 8	Crescent Athletic Club*	Lusk Reservoir • West Point, New York	L 1–2	0–2–0
February 11	Boston College*	Lusk Reservoir • West Point, New York	L 2–5	0–3–0
February 12	New York Military Academy*	Lusk Reservoir • West Point, New York	W 1–0	1–3–0
February 15	YMCA College*	Lusk Reservoir • West Point, New York	L 0–1	1–4–0
*Non-conference game.
