= 1917–18 Boston College men's ice hockey season =

- Conference: Independent
- Home ice: Boston Arena

Record
- Overall: 2–1–0
- Home: 0–1–0
- Neutral: 2–0–0

Coaches and captains
- Head coach: Bob Fowler
- Captain: Walter Falvey

The 1917–18 Boston College men's ice hockey season was the inaugural season of play for the program.

== Season ==
Having started their ice hockey program during World War I, when many programs had suspended, Boston College had few options for opponents and had to settle for uncommon opposition. Their third and final game of the year was against future-arch rival Boston University.

Note: Boston College's athletic programs weren't known as the 'Eagles' until 1920.

== Roster ==
No.	Nat.	Player	Class	Pos	Height	Weight	DoB	Hometown	Previous team
	(United States)	Edmund Burke						Cambridge, Massachusetts
	(United States)	Philip Corrigan					1898-04-28	Dorchester, Massachusetts
	(United States)	Eddie Enright						Allston, Massachusetts
	(United States)	Walter Falvey (C)						Brighton, Massachusetts
	(United States)	James Fitzpatrick		G				Meriden, Connecticut
	(United States)	Frank Morrissey	Freshman				1899-03-11	Medford, Massachusetts
		Ben Murray		G
	(United States)	Florence O'Connell		G				Arlington, Massachusetts
	(United States)	Paul Ryan						Needham, Massachusetts
	(United States)	George White						Cambridge, Massachusetts

== Standings ==
1917–18 Collegiate ice hockey standings
	Intercollegiate							Overall					
	GP	W	L	T	PCT.	GF	GA	GP	W	L	T	GF	GA
Army	3	2	1	0	.667	11	5	9	6	3	0	27	9
Boston College	1	1	0	0	1.000	3	1	3	2	1	0	12	7
Boston University	1	0	1	0	.000	1	3	1	0	1	0	1	3
Dartmouth	3	2	1	0	.667	10	5	6	2	4	0	16	25
Massachusetts Agricultural	8	5	2	1	.688	22	15	8	5	2	1	22	15
Polytechnic Institute of Brooklyn	–	–	–	–	–	–	–	–	–	–	–	–	–
Rensselaer	3	0	2	1	.167	1	19	3	0	2	1	1	19
Tufts	–	–	–	–	–	–	–	4	1	3	0	–	–
Williams	3	2	1	0	.667	19	4	3	2	1	0	19	4
Yale	1	1	0	0	1.000	7	2	1	1	0	0	7	2
YMCA College	–	–	–	–	–	–	–	–	–	–	–	–	–

== Schedule and results ==
Date	Opponent	Site	Result	Record
Regular Season
January 9	vs. Harvard Radio School*	Boston Arena • Boston, Massachusetts	W 7–1	1–0–0
January 26	vs. Newport Naval Reserves*	Boston Arena • Boston, Massachusetts	L 2–5	1–1–0
February 6	vs. Boston University*	Boston Arena • Boston, Massachusetts	W 3–1	2–1–0
*Non-conference game.
