= 1920–21 Harvard Crimson men's ice hockey season =

College ice hockey season

Intercollegiate Champion Triangular Hockey League, Champion
- Conference: 1st Triangular League
- Home ice: Boston Arena

Record
- Overall: 8–2–0
- Conference: 3–0–0
- Home: 5–2–0
- Neutral: 3–0–0

Coaches and captains
- Head coach: William Claflin
- Captain: Edward Bigelow

The 1920–21 Harvard Crimson men's ice hockey season was the 23rd season of play for the program.

== Season ==
Harvard received tremendous news before the season; the repairs to the Boston Arena were complete and the venue was ready to be used once more. With the Crimson now possessing a surface that could accommodate 7-on-7 hockey once more, as well as coach Clafin affirming his preference for the style, Harvard returned to its familiar style of play and began the season with a dominating win over King's College.

The results didn't change when Harvard began playing other US colleges and the Crimson ran roughshod over their competition. Jabish Holmes recorded four consecutive shutouts including matching 7–0 victories over rivals Princeton and Yale. The only thing that stopped Harvard from rolling to an undefeated season was a visit by the St. Patrick's Hockey Club of Ottawa, who won a pair of one-goal games in mid-February. Harvard seemed to take issue with the losses and thrashed their final two opponents, capping another championship season.

Princeton attempted to schedule a second game with Harvard at the Philadelphia Ice Palace but the Tigers were unsuccessful in their efforts. As a result, the single game between the two had to stand for the season series.

== Roster ==
No.	Nat.	Player	Class	Pos	Height	Weight	DoB	Hometown	Previous team
	(United States)	Donald Angier	Junior	LW			1900-01-12	Newton, Massachusetts	Taft School
	(United States)	Francis M. Bacon III	Senior	LW			1899-05-14	Short Hills, New Jersey	St. Paul's School
	(United States)	Charles W. Baker	Junior	RW			1900-12-18	New York, New York	St. Paul's School
	(United States)	Edward L. Bigelow (C)	Senior	C			1899-04-19	Boston, Massachusetts	St. Mark's School
	(United States)	Roger W. Buntin	Senior	C			1898-06-23	Newtonville, Massachusetts	Newton High School
	(United States)	Robert W. Emmons	Senior	RW			1897-07-11	Bourne, Massachusetts	Groton School
	(United States)	Jabish Holmes Jr.	Senior	G			1899-03-11	Pelham Manor, New York	Middlesex School
	(United States)	Richard S. Humphrey	Senior	D			1898-05-04	Boston, Massachusetts
	(United States)	Joseph Larocque	Sophomore	C				Bernardsville, New Jersey
	(United States)	John M. Martin	Junior	C			1900-05-09	Manchester, New Hampshire	Pomfret School
	(United States)	George Owen Jr.	Sophomore	D	5' 11" (1.8 m)	190 lb (86 kg)	1901-12-02	Hamilton, Ontario
	(United States)	Henry B. W. Snelling	Senior	C			1899-02-14	Newton Center, Massachusetts	St. Mark's School
	(United States)	Carl S. Stillman	Senior	G			1898-03-05	Boston, Massachusetts
	(United States)	Elijah H. Stillman	Junior	C/D			1899-03-21	Wellesley, Massachusetts

== Standings ==
1920–21 College ice hockey standings
	Intercollegiate							Overall					
	GP	W	L	T	Pct.	GF	GA	GP	W	L	T	GF	GA
Amherst	7	0	7	0	.000	8	19	7	0	7	0	8	19
Army	3	0	2	1	.167	6	11	3	0	2	1	6	11
Bates	4	2	2	0	.500	7	8	8	4	4	0	22	20
Boston College	7	6	1	0	.857	27	11	8	6	2	0	28	18
Bowdoin	4	0	3	1	.125	1	10	7	1	5	1	10	23
Buffalo	–	–	–	–	–	–	–	6	0	6	0	–	–
Carnegie Tech	5	0	4	1	.100	4	18	5	0	4	1	4	18
Clarkson	1	0	1	0	.000	1	6	3	2	1	0	12	14
Colgate	4	1	3	0	.250	8	14	5	2	3	0	9	14
Columbia	5	1	4	0	.200	21	24	5	1	4	0	21	24
Cornell	5	3	2	0	.600	22	10	5	3	2	0	22	10
Dartmouth	9	5	3	1	.611	24	21	11	6	4	1	30	27
Fordham	–	–	–	–	–	–	–	–	–	–	–	–	–
Hamilton	–	–	–	–	–	–	–	10	10	0	0	–	–
Harvard	6	6	0	0	1.000	42	3	10	8	2	0	55	8
Massachusetts Agricultural	7	3	4	0	.429	18	17	7	3	4	0	18	17
Michigan College of Mines	2	1	1	0	.500	9	5	10	6	4	0	29	21
MIT	6	3	3	0	.500	13	21	7	3	4	0	16	25
New York State	–	–	–	–	–	–	–	–	–	–	–	–	–
Notre Dame	3	2	1	0	.667	7	9	3	2	1	0	7	9
Pennsylvania	8	3	4	1	.438	17	37	9	3	5	1	18	44
Princeton	7	4	3	0	.571	18	16	8	4	4	0	20	23
Rensselaer	4	1	3	0	.250	7	13	4	1	3	0	7	13
Tufts	–	–	–	–	–	–	–	–	–	–	–	–	–
Williams	5	4	1	0	.800	17	10	6	5	1	0	21	10
Yale	8	3	4	1	.438	21	33	10	3	6	1	25	47
YMCA College	6	5	0	1	.917	17	9	7	5	1	1	20	16

1920–21 Triangular Hockey League standings
	Conference								Overall					
	GP	W	L	T	PTS	SW	GF	GA	GP	W	L	T	GF	GA
Harvard *	3	3	0	0	1.000	2	27	1	10	8	2	0	55	8
Princeton	3	2	1	0	.667	1	8	9	8	4	4	0	20	23
Yale	4	0	4	0	.000	0	3	28	10	3	6	1	25	47
* indicates conference champion

== Schedule and results ==
Date	Opponent	Site	Result	Record
Regular season
January 8	King's*	Boston Arena • Boston, Massachusetts	W 8–1	1–0–0
January 12	vs. Boston Athletic Association*	Boston Arena • Boston, Massachusetts	W 4–1	2–0–0
January 19	Massachusetts Agricultural*	Boston Arena • Boston, Massachusetts	W 2–0	3–0–0
January 22	Dartmouth*	Boston Arena • Boston, Massachusetts	W 5–0	4–0–0
January 29	Princeton	Boston Arena • Boston, Massachusetts	W 7–0	5–0–0 (1–0–0)
February 5	Yale	Philadelphia Ice Palace • Philadelphia, Pennsylvania (Rivalry)	W 7–0	6–0–0 (2–0–0)
February 10	St. Patrick's Hockey Club*	Boston Arena • Boston, Massachusetts	L 0–1	6–1–0
February 14	St. Patrick's Hockey Club*	Boston Arena • Boston, Massachusetts	L 1–2	6–2–0
February 16	vs. MIT*	Boston Arena • Boston, Massachusetts	W 8–2	7–2–0
February 26	Yale	Boston Arena • Boston, Massachusetts (Rivalry)	W 13–1	8–2–0 (3–0–0)
*Non-conference game.
