= 1918–19 Harvard Crimson men's ice hockey season =

College ice hockey season

- Conference: Independent

Record
- Overall: 7–0–0
- Home: 1–0–0
- Road: 1–0–0
- Neutral: 5–0–0

Coaches and captains
- Captain: Robert Gross

The 1918–19 Harvard Crimson men's ice hockey season was the 21st season of play for the program.

== Season ==
When World War I ended in November, many American servicemen began to return home. With a transatlantic flight having yet to be completed, the weeks-long sea crossing was the quickest way to return home. It was no mean feat for Harvard to play its first hockey game exactly two months after the ceasefire, but the team was aided by the informal team that had played during the previous winter.

The ice hockey team had to overcome an additional hardship due to their home rink, the Boston Arena, having been seriously damaged by fire shortly after the War ended. On short notice the team was able to secure the Charlesbank Rink for three games, so named due it being located on the banks of the Charles River, near where the Daly Memorial Rink currently sits (as of 2020). The team played the Boston Hockey Club on January 11 and swiftly surrendered two goals to their opponents. Harvard redoubled their efforts to cut the lead in half before the end of the half and then allowed Avery to score twice in the second half to complete his hat-trick earn the win for the Crimson.

It would be almost three weeks before the team would play their next game, but by that time they had settled on a captain. Robert Gross, who was on the 1917 squad and led the informal team the year before, was chosen to lead the squad once more. The first match with Gross as captain was against the Camp Devens team and, despite playing on soft ice, Harvard was able to overcome the larger team. The next night the Crimson faced Boston College for the first time in their history. Harvard was dominant in the inaugural game for what would become an enduring cross-town rivalry.

After a second win over the Boston Hockey Club, Harvard headed south to renew its rivalry with Yale at the Brooklyn Ice Palace. Harvard jumped on the Elis early, scoring twice in the first seven minutes of the game and adding a fourth just before the end of the half. The second was a more even period but the Crimson skated away with a 4–1 victory. The following week Harvard headed up to Concord, New Hampshire, for a narrow victory over St. Paul's School that was marred by soft, slushy ice, and then returned to Brooklyn for their final game against Princeton. The Tigers blitzed Harvard early, scoring 45 seconds into the match, but Harvard settled the game down afterwards and scored three timed before Princeton could tally again. The Crimson were utterly dominant in the second half, possessing the puck for much of the time and scoring four times to take the match with a convincing win.

Harvard finished the season with a perfect record, including wins over Princeton and Yale, but with so few teams playing and most competing in only a handful of games, Harvard would not lay any claim to a championship. They would, however, use their success in 1919 as a springboard for the following year with a full season expected.

== Roster ==
No.	Nat.	Player	Class	Pos	Height	Weight	DoB	Hometown	Previous team
		Adams		C/LW
	(United States)	Thomas M. Avery	Sophomore	C/LW	5' 10" (1.78 m)	145 lb (66 kg)	1898-08-03	Chicago, Illinois	St. Paul's School
	(United States)	Francis M. Bacon III	Sophomore	C/LW	5' 10" (1.78 m)	142 lb (64 kg)	1899-05-14	Short Hills, New Jersey	St. Paul's School
	(United States)	George S. Baldwin	Sophomore	C/LW			1898-12-03	Chestnut Hill, Massachusetts	Phillips Academy
	(United States)	Edward L. Bigelow	Sophomore	C	5' 11" (1.8 m)	159 lb (72 kg)	1899-04-19	Boston, Massachusetts	St. Mark's School
	(United States)	Alexander H. Bright	Senior	C/RW			1897-12-16	Cambridge, Massachusetts	Browne & Nichols School
	(United States)	Roger W. Buntin	Sophomore	C			1898-06-23	Newtonville, Massachusetts	Newton High School
	(United States)	Edward Cabot	Junior	C			1898-05-13	Milton, Massachusetts	Milton Academy
	(United States)	Frederic C. Church	Junior	D			1897-05-22	Lowell, Massachusetts	St. Paul's School
	(United States)	Charles A. Clark Jr.	Senior	D			1898-02-15	Somerville, Massachusetts	Milton Academy
	(United States)	Robert E. Gross (C)	Senior	RW	5' 6" (1.68 m)	135 lb (61 kg)	1897-05-11	West Roxbury, Massachusetts	St. George's School
		Higgins		LW
	(United States)	Jabish Holmes Jr.	Sophomore	G	6' 0" (1.83 m)	197 lb (89 kg)	1899-03-11	Pelham Manor, New York	Middlesex School
	(United States)	John A. Sessions	Sophomore	D			1899-05-21	Brooklyn, New York	St. Paul's School
	(United States)	Henry B. W. Snelling	Junior	C/LW			1899-02-14	Newton Center, Massachusetts	St. Mark's School
	(United States)	Norman S. Walker	Junior	D	5' 8" (1.73 m)	148 lb (67 kg)	1897-12-21	Castleton Corners, New York	St. Paul's School
	(United States)	Henry K. White	Senior	D	6' 1" (1.85 m)	153 lb (69 kg)	1897-02-23	Brookline, Massachusetts	St. Paul's School

== Standings ==
1918–19 Collegiate ice hockey standings
	Intercollegiate							Overall					
	GP	W	L	T	PCT.	GF	GA	GP	W	L	T	GF	GA
Army	2	0	2	0	.000	2	6	5	1	4	0	4	9
Assumption	–	–	–	–	–	–	–	–	–	–	–	–	–
Boston College	2	1	1	0	.500	7	9	3	2	1	0	10	9
Hamilton	–	–	–	–	–	–	–	2	1	0	1	–	–
Harvard	3	3	0	0	1.000	18	5	7	7	0	0	31	10
Massachusetts Agricultural	3	1	0	2	.667	2	0	3	1	0	2	2	0
Princeton	2	0	2	0	.000	3	13	2	0	2	0	3	13
Rensselaer	1	0	1	0	.000	1	4	0	0	1	0	1	4
Williams	1	0	1	0	.000	0	2	1	0	1	0	0	2
Yale	2	1	1	0	.500	7	5	2	1	1	0	7	5
YMCA College	–	–	–	–	–	–	–	–	–	–	–	–	–

== Schedule and results ==
Date	Opponent	Site	Result	Record
Regular Season
January 11	vs. Boston Hockey Club*	Charlesbank Rink • Brighton, Massachusetts	W 3–2	1–0–0
January 30	Fort Devens*	Cambridge, Massachusetts	W 3–0	2–0–0
January 31	vs. Boston College*	Charlesbank Rink • Brighton, Massachusetts	W 7–2	3–0–0
February 1	vs. Boston Hockey Club*	Charlesbank Rink • Brighton, Massachusetts	W 3–0	4–0–0
February 8	vs. Yale*	Brooklyn Ice Palace • Brooklyn, New York (Rivalry)	W 4–1	5–0–0
February 15	at St. Paul's School*	Concord, New Hampshire	W 4–3	6–0–0
February 22	vs. Princeton*	Brooklyn Ice Palace • Brooklyn, New York	W 7–2	7–0–0
*Non-conference game.
