= 1918–19 United States collegiate men's ice hockey season =

- Duration: January 1919– March 1919
- Collegiate champion: None

The 1918–19 United States collegiate men's ice hockey season was the 25th season of collegiate ice hockey.

== Regular season ==
=== Standings ===
1918–19 Collegiate ice hockey standings
	Intercollegiate							Overall					
	GP	W	L	T	PCT.	GF	GA	GP	W	L	T	GF	GA
Army	2	0	2	0	.000	2	6	5	1	4	0	4	9
Assumption	–	–	–	–	–	–	–	–	–	–	–	–	–
Boston College	2	1	1	0	.500	7	9	3	2	1	0	10	9
Hamilton	–	–	–	–	–	–	–	2	1	0	1	–	–
Harvard	3	3	0	0	1.000	18	5	7	7	0	0	31	10
Massachusetts Agricultural	3	1	0	2	.667	2	0	3	1	0	2	2	0
Princeton	2	0	2	0	.000	3	13	2	0	2	0	3	13
Rensselaer	1	0	1	0	.000	1	4	0	0	1	0	1	4
Williams	1	0	1	0	.000	0	2	1	0	1	0	0	2
Yale	2	1	1	0	.500	7	5	2	1	1	0	7	5
YMCA College	–	–	–	–	–	–	–	–	–	–	–	–	–
