= 181st Street Ice Palace =

Former ice rink in New York City

- Palais de Glace
- Interactive map of 181st Street Ice Palace
- Location: 500 W. 181st Street; Manhattan, NY, 10033
- Coordinates: 40°50′53″N 73°55′53″W

Construction
- Opened: 1917
- Closed: After 1925

Tenant
- Columbia Lions men's ice hockey (1920–1923)

The 181st Street Ice Palace in Manhattan, New York was an indoor, artificial ice rink. The venue was used for a variety of ice-related activities but was primarily a figure skating and speed skating rink.

== History ==
Sometime prior to the United States' entry into World War I, a new ice rink opened in Manhattan. Initially it was a big success, however, during the summer of 1917 the price of artificial ice was fixed at $4.40 a ton (approximately $111 in 2022) and the rink was forced to close as an unnecessary luxury. The rink reopened shortly after the end of the war and became the home for Joe Moore, who would go on to compete in the first winter Olympiad in 1924.

For a few years, the rink also served as a home for the Columbia Lions men's ice hockey. While the rink was not designed with ice hockey in mind, the team used the rink for three seasons before they decided the arrangement was untenable and suspended operations until a better venue could be found.
