= Edward Bigelow (ice hockey) =

American ice hockey player and coach

Biographical details
- Born: April 19, 1899; Boston, Massachusetts, USA
- Died: August 20, 1975 (aged 76); Boston, Massachusetts, USA
- Education: Harvard University

Playing career
- 1918–1921: Harvard
- 1921–1922: Boston Athletic Association
- 1922–1923: Boston Hockey Club

Coaching career (HC unless noted)
- 1924–1927: Harvard

Head coaching record
- Overall: 25–8–2 (.743)

Accomplishments and honors

Championships
- 1920 THL Championship; 1920 Intercollegiate Championship; 1921 THL Championship; 1921 Intercollegiate Championship; 1926 THL Championship; 1926 East Intercollegiate Championship; 1927 East Intercollegiate Championship

Edward Livingston Bigelow (April 19, 1899 – August 20, 1975) was an American ice hockey player and coach for Harvard who was active in the 1910s and 1920s.

== Career ==
After graduating from St. Mark's School, Bigelow began attending Harvard University in 1917 while much of the student body had left for Europe to fight in World War I. Due to the lack of available athletes, Harvard had suspended both its varsity and freshman ice hockey teams for the duration of the war and only an informal agglomeration existed. In November of the following year the war ended with the 1918 armistice and the surviving undergraduates began to return to their respective colleges. Harvard, as well as several other colleges, were quick to restart their ice hockey programs and Bigelow was among the players that appeared for the team in 1919. Harvard finished the season with an undefeated record (7–0), however, because the team played only three intercollegiate games and many schools had yet to return, no championship was either conferred or claimed for the season.

The next year ice hockey returned for a full season and Harvard was expected to be among the top programs in the nation. Unfortunately, the Crimson started slow, losing their first three contests. This was due in part to having to use the Pavilion ice rink, a much smaller surface that could only fit six players for each team rather than the normal seven. Because none of those games were intercollegiate matches, Harvard's chances for a National Championship were not affected and, when the team met Yale for the first collegiate game of the season, Harvard had grown accustomed enough to the rink to eke out a 5–4 win. Bigelow was one of the team's stars as the Crimson went on a winning streak that extended until the end of the season. Harvard won 10 consecutive games and finished undefeated in collegiate play, earning themselves the Triangular Hockey League Championship (also called the "Big Three" Championship) and were the Intercollegiate Champions.

Bigelow was named team captain for his senior season and the team continued to dominate their opponents. They won their first six games of the season but had their winning streak snapped at 16 with a pair of losses to the St. Patrick's Hockey Club of Ottawa. Because their losses were to an amateur team Harvard's collegiate standings were again unaffected and after they finished the season with two more intercollegiate wins (including the largest victory the program has ever produced over Yale) Harvard won its second consecutive Intercollegiate Title. Because the western schools had yet to play a significant number of intercollegiate games, this was also the last time that one program could claim a unified Intercollegiate Championship until after World War II.

After graduating, Bigelow played amateur hockey in the Boston area before returning to his alma mater to take over head coaching duties. In the interim Harvard, as well as all college programs, had fundamentally changed their playing style by adopting the modern 6-on-6 format. In his first season Bigelow didn't seem affected by the change in style, continuing the staunch defensive game plan that had been emphasized at Harvard for well over a decade. Aside from a pair of losses to two amateur clubs, Harvard won each of their first six games, allowing more than two goals only once. They even provided defending champion Yale with their first loss of the season and entered the game on February 14 with a chance at an Intercollegiate title. The Bulldogs, however, were able to get their revenge and even the season series with a 3–2 win of their own and Harvard's offense failed to score in the rubber match, giving Yale the Eastern Intercollegiate Championship.

Bigelow's second year as coach was much like his second season as a player. The team began with an uninspired win over MIT and then dropped their next three games. With panic setting in for the Crimson faithful, Harvard's offense woke up just in time for the match with Princeton and the team proceeded to win seven consecutive matches, sweeping their conference schedule and finishing with an 8–1 record against collegiate opponents. They were able to dethrone Yale as the Eastern champions, winning their first title in four years. In his third season behind the bench, Bigelow's defense was overpowering and held their opponents to less than two goals in half of their games. Only the Canadian clubs were able to get more than two goals behind the Crimson netminders and Harvard dominated their opposition. The team finished undefeated in intercollegiate play, going 9–1–2 in all matches, and won their second consecutive Eastern Intercollegiate Championship.

After the season, Bigelow announced that he was resigning as head coach to devote himself fully to his business career. He finished with a sterling record and was even more impressive against collegiate opponents (22–3–1).

Bigelow eventually became president of the State Street Bank in 1950 and then Chairman of the Board before retiring in 1965.

He died of cancer at Massachusetts General Hospital in 1975.

== Statistics ==
=== Regular season and playoffs ===
			Regular season					Playoffs
Season	Team	League	GP	G	A	Pts	PIM	GP	G	A	Pts	PIM
1918–19	Harvard	NCAA	—	—	—	—	—	—	—	—	—	—
1919–20	Harvard	NCAA	—	—	—	—	—	—	—	—	—	—
1920–21	Harvard	NCAA	—	—	—	—	—	—	—	—	—	—
NCAA totals			—	—	—	—	—	—	—	—	—	—

Note: Assists were not recorded as an official statistic.

== Head coaching record ==
Record table
Season	Team	Overall	Conference	Standing	Postseason
Harvard Crimson (Triangular League) (1924–1926)
1924–25	Harvard	8–4–0	2–2–0	2nd	
1925–26	Harvard	8–3–0	4–0–0	1st	East Intercollegiate Champion
Harvard:		16–7–0	6–2–0		
Harvard Crimson Independent (1926–1927)
1926–27	Harvard	9–1–2			East Intercollegiate Champion
Harvard:		9–1–2			
Total:		25–8–2			
National champion Postseason invitational champion Conference regular season champion Conference regular season and conference tournament champion Division regular season champion Division regular season and conference tournament champion Conference tournament champion
