= Walter Falvey =

Biographical details
- Born: 1897; Boston, Massachusetts, U.S.
- Died: January 23, 1983 (aged 85); Pompano Beach, Florida, U.S.

Playing career

Ice hockey
- 1917–1919: Boston College

Coaching career (HC unless noted)

Ice hockey
- 1919–1920: Boston College

Head coaching record
- Overall: 6-2

Walter Alphonsus "Dido" Falvey (1897–1983) was an American ice hockey player and coach who was the head coach of the Boston College Eagles men's ice hockey during the 1919–20 season.

== Hockey ==
Falvey played hockey for four season at Boston College High School and was captain during the 1913–14 season. He was captain of Boston College hockey team during its first two seasons in existence. He graduated in 1919, but returned to the team on January 15, 1920 as head coach. He led B.C. to a 6–2 record in his only season as coach.

== Later life ==
Falvey was also an amateur golfer. He became the golf pro at the Waltham Country Club when it opened in 1923, but decided to return the amateur ranks after only a year.

He lived Belmont, Massachusetts for more than 55 years before retiring to Florida. He died on January 23, 1983 in Pompano Beach, Florida after suffering a heart attack. He was survived by his wife and three children. He was buried in St. Joseph Cemetery in West Roxbury, Massachusetts.
