= James Wallace Conant =

Coordinates: 40.472°N 79.951°W

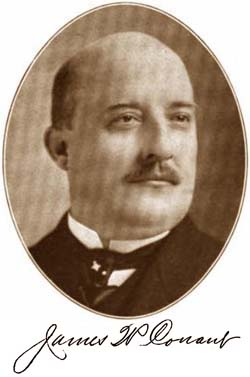
- Born: August 10, 1862; Portsmouth, Ohio, United States
- Died: March 14, 1906 (aged 43); New York City, United States
- Resting place: Allegheny Cemetery
- Occupation: Amusement manager
- Years active: 1893–1906
- Known for: Founder of the Western Pennsylvania Hockey League; Manager of the Schenley Park Casino; Manager of the Duquesne Garden
- Spouse: Margaret Conant

James Wallace Conant (August 10, 1862 – March 14, 1906) was an amusement manager who later became the manager of the Schenley Park Casino, as well as the first manager of the Duquesne Garden, the first indoor ice rinks in the city of Pittsburgh. Conant is credited with bringing the sport of ice hockey to Pittsburgh, since the indoor ice rinks lured many Canadian players to the city. Over time several of the Canadian players were actually paid to play hockey first at the Casino, and later at the Gardens. He was also the founder of the Western Pennsylvania Hockey League, the first hockey league to openly hire and trade players.

== Biography ==
=== Early life ===
Conant was born in Portsmouth, Ohio in 1862. At the age of 15 he moved with his mother to Pittsburgh. Once he arrived, Conant took an interest in the city's rivers and he eventually took a job as a steward on a river steamer. He made his home near the bluff above the Monongahela River in the city's Hill District.

=== Schenley Park Casino ===
After a few years of working on the river, Conant took interest in the amusement industry. Throughout his twenties he worked in theater houses, located in the city's Hill District, a few downtown night clubs, and as a coordinator for a barge company with docks along the Mon Wharf. By the age of 36, Conant's reputation in the amusements industry caught the attention of Christopher Magee, a political boss in Pittsburgh, was made him the manager of the proposed Schenley Park Casino.

In the fall of 1893, the goal of the Casino was to provide Pittsburgh with a facility that would be a place for theater, recreation and social gathering for all social classes of people. The idea sputtered through a committee of capitalists until Conant convinced his boss, who was the head of the Casino, Harry Davis, that the new building could feature an indoor ice skating rink. After learning that an artificial ice surface was possible, investors were quick to agree to financing $400,000 for the construction of the Casino, which was completed before opening to the public May 29, 1895. While managing the Casino, Conant introduced ice hockey to Pittsburgh. Conant knew of ice hockey through a fellow amusement mangager involved with traveling ice skating demonstrations, and convinced his bosses that the city would be entertained by the speed and elegance of hockey.

Soon the Casino's patrons were captivated the new sport and organized games, which were scheduled on Friday nights after the public ice skating session. Many Canadian players flocked to Pittsburgh to use the artificial ice. The ice surface provided the Canadian players two months of play before they returned home to play in outdoor leagues back home. It was at this time that several players were openly paid to play in Pittsburgh. However, nineteen months after its opening, the Casino was destroyed by a fire. The cause of the blaze was determined to come from an ammonia pipe in the icemaking department. The pipe began leaking and the gas mixed with grease and created an explosion resulting in a fire that consumed the equipment room in the rear of the Casino and spread to the ladies' dressing room. The fire not only destroyed the Casino, it also left Conant without a job.

=== Duquesne Garden and the WPHL ===
Coanant spent the next three winters in New York. There he used his knowledge of artificial ice surfaces to manage the New York Ice Palace. While in New York, he introduced that city's residents to indoor skating and ice hockey. However while he spent his winters in New York, he returned to Pittsburgh every summer to work at Kennywood Park as a catering manager. He also ran a refreshment stand in the summers in Schenley Park, on the site of old Casino. However Conant returned to Pittsburgh to manage the city's second ice arena, the Duquesne Garden. Once Christopher Magee received the political and financial support to open the new multi-purpose facility in Pittsburgh, he chose Conant to manage the Gardens. Conant held the manager job from 1899 until 1903.

It was during this time, that Conant formally established the Western Pennsylvania Hockey League, with three teams the Pittsburgh Bankers, Pittsburgh Athletic Club and Pittsburgh Keystones. However the three team league also played exhibition games against the best amateur teams from all over North America. As with the Casino, Canadian players once again took to Pittsburgh's artificial ice surface. In 1901 Pittsburgh had lured future Hall-of-Famers like Riley Hern and Alf Smith into the league, along with several of the era's top players such as; Lorne Campbell and Arthur Sixsmith. The success of the Western Pennsylvania Hockey League, resulted in Pittsburgh earning a team in the brief International Professional Hockey League in 1904. Conant is also credited with bringing the Metropolitan Grand Opera Company to Pittsburgh.

=== Mysterious death ===
Conant then managed the Farmer's Bank Building, but that job only lasted nine months, after which he worked as a manager of a restaurant until September 1905. Conant had hoped to move his wife and mother to either Boston or New York and began exploring business opportunities in those cities. He left for a business trip to the Northeast on March 3, 1906, to look up two amusement propositions, one of which he proposed to take hold of. The last letter Conant sent to his friends in Pittsburgh stated that he was heading to New York.

On March 14, Conant died under mysterious circumstances at the Navarra Hotel in New York. Controversy soon surrounded his death, since two versions of death were published in the Pittsburgh newspapers. While the morning newspapers said it was sudden and natural, the afternoon papers suggested that the events surrounding his death involved alcoholism and infidelity. According to the afternoon newspapers, Conant checked into the hotel under the name of "J.C. Wallace", along with two women, whom he recorded as his "wife" and "friend of wife". However, his wife Margaret was in Pittsburgh when she was notified of his death by a Pittsburgh doctor, who was said to be traveling with Conant in New York. This doctor signed his death certificate, listing the cause as "heart attack". However, a New York-based doctor later disputed the account of Conant's doctor, stating, "I am not at all convinced that this man died of natural causes." Robbery and murder were also hinted as the motives behind Canant's death. The Pittsburg Gazette reported the body was moved to the Navarra and that some dispute took place in New York. His personal belongs, including $600 and a diamond stickpin, were missing. Conant's body was then returned to Pittsburgh and picked up at the train station. He was buried at Allegheny Cemetery on St. Patrick's Day.
