= 1898–99 WPHL season =

1898–1899 WPHL season
- League: Western Pennsylvania Hockey League
- Sport: Ice hockey
- Teams: 3

Regular season
- Season champions: Pittsburgh Athletic Club (1st title)

Seasons
- 1896–97 1899–1900

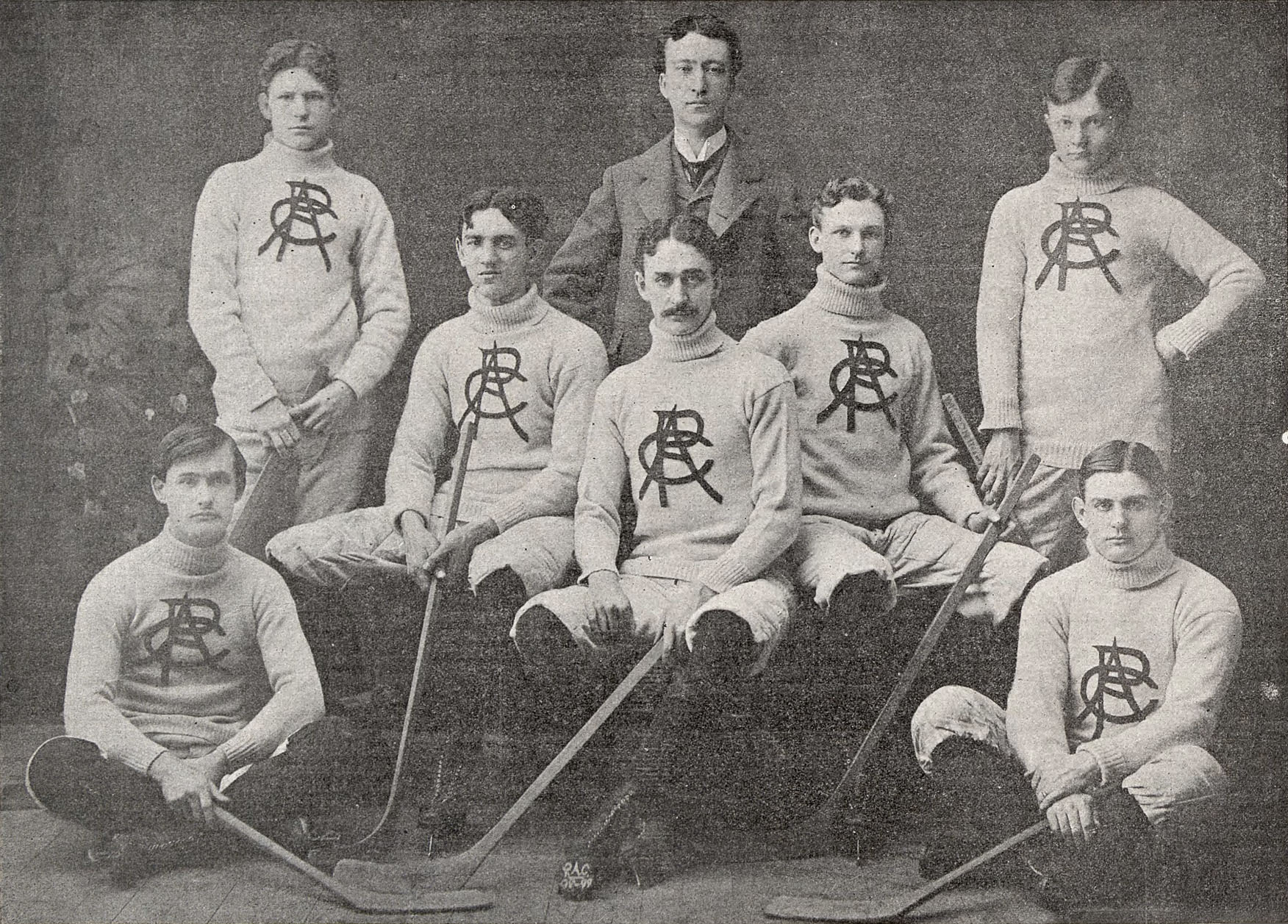
Pittsburgh Athletic Club, league champions

The 1898–99 WPHL season was the second season of operation for the Western Pennsylvania Hockey League. Four Pittsburgh-area teams competed in the season, in which all games were played at the Duquesne Garden. The league reconstituted in the newly finished hockey rink at the Duquesne Garden, after the Schenley Park Casino was destroyed in an 1896 fire that cut short the previous WPHL season. The so-called "Pittsburgh" or "All-Pittsburgh" team of the first season was not reformed and only three teams played in the league.

The Pittsburgh Athletic Club won 9 of 12 games to win their first WPHL championship.

== Season ==
=== Final standings ===
Note GP = Games Played, W = Wins, L = Losses, T = Ties, GF = Goals For, GA = Goals Against, PCT = Percentage

Team	GP	W	L	T	GF	GA	PCT
Pittsburgh Athletic Club	12	9	2	1	21	7	.792
Duquesne Country & Athletic Club	12	4	5	3	13	10	.458
Western University	12	2	8	2	5	22	.250

=== Results ===
Month	Day	Team	Score	Team	Score
January	24	Pittsburgh AC	4	Western U	0
January	27	Duquesne C&AC	0	Western U	0
January	31	Duquesne C&AC	0	Pittsburgh AC	0
February	3	Pittsburgh AC	1	Western U	0
February	7	Duquesne C&AC	2	Western U	0
February	10	Pittsburgh AC	2	Duquesne C&AC	1
February	14	Pittsburgh AC	2	Western U	0
February	17	Western U	0	Duquesne C&AC	0
February	21	Pittsburgh AC	2	Duquesne C&AC	1
February	28	Western U	1	Duquesne C&AC	0
March	7	Pittsburgh AC	2	Western U	0
March	10	Duquesne C&AC	3	Western U	0
March	14	Pittsburgh AC	1	Duquesne C&AC	0
March	17	Pittsburgh AC	2	Western U	1
March	24	Duquesne C&AC	2	Pittsburgh AC	1
March	28	Pittsburgh AC	4	Western U	0
March	31	Western U	3	Duquesne C&AC	2
April	4	Duquesne C&AC	2	Pittsburgh AC	0

Preceded by 1896–97	WPHL seasons 1898–99	Succeeded by 1899–1900
