= Garnet Sixsmith =

Canadian ice hockey player

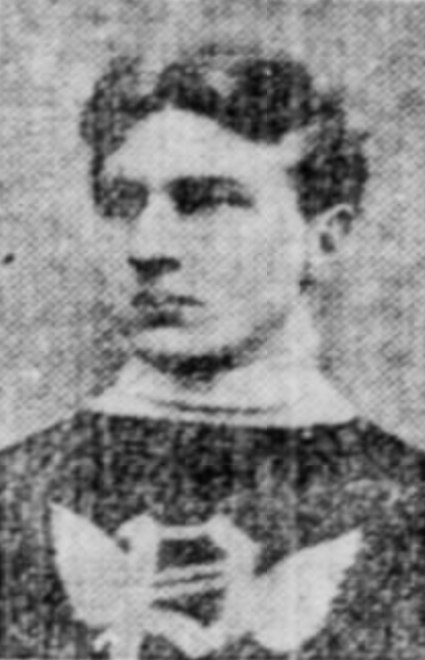
- Sixsmith with the Pittsburgh Professionals in 1905
- Born: January 15, 1885 Ottawa, Ontario, Canada
- Died: March 12, 1967 (aged 82) Windsor, Ontario, Canada
- Position: Right wing
- Shot: Right
- Played for: Pittsburgh Victorias; Pittsburgh Lyceum; Pittsburgh Athletic Club; Pittsburgh Professionals; Sault Ste. Marie Marlboros; Pittsburgh Winter Garden team
- Playing career: 1902–1910

Garnet Mosgrove Sixsmith (January 15, 1885 – March 12, 1967) was a Canadian professional ice hockey player. One of the first professional ice hockey players, he played professionally in Pittsburgh, Pennsylvania, from 1902 until 1910. His brother Arthur Sixsmith also played professional ice hockey.

== Playing career ==
Born in Ottawa, Ontario, Canada, Sixsmith learned ice hockey at an early age. He played in 1901 for the Canadian Soo. That same year his brother Arthur, visited Pittsburgh, and decided to stay, and help found a hockey league. Art then convinced Garnet and several other Canadian players to play in the very first openly professional league, the Western Pennsylvania Hockey League (WPHL).

He then moved to Pittsburgh to play professionally in 1902. Sixsmith played for several WPHL teams, the Pittsburgh Victorias, Pittsburgh Lyceum and Pittsburgh Athletic Club between 1902 and 1910. He also played in the International Professional Hockey League for the Pittsburgh Professionals. Sixsmith spent his entire professional career in Pittsburgh, with the exception of one season in which he played for the Canadian Soo. In one memorable game, the visiting Portage Lakes Hockey Club played at the Duquesne Garden. Just before the game began, Portage Lakes' William "Lady" Taylor told Sixsmith; "I'm going to break your leg tonight". Sixsmith replied to Taylor with the Bronx cheer gesture. However, later in the game, Garnet's leg was broken, in three separate locations. Of the incident, he later stated that he was shocked that any man could hurt him like that because he was always able to take care of himself. However at Sixsmith's very next time game at the Duquesne Garden, he scored 11 goals. The 11 goals is considered to be a record for the Duquesne Garden, one that has not yet been broken by any Pittsburgh hockey player.

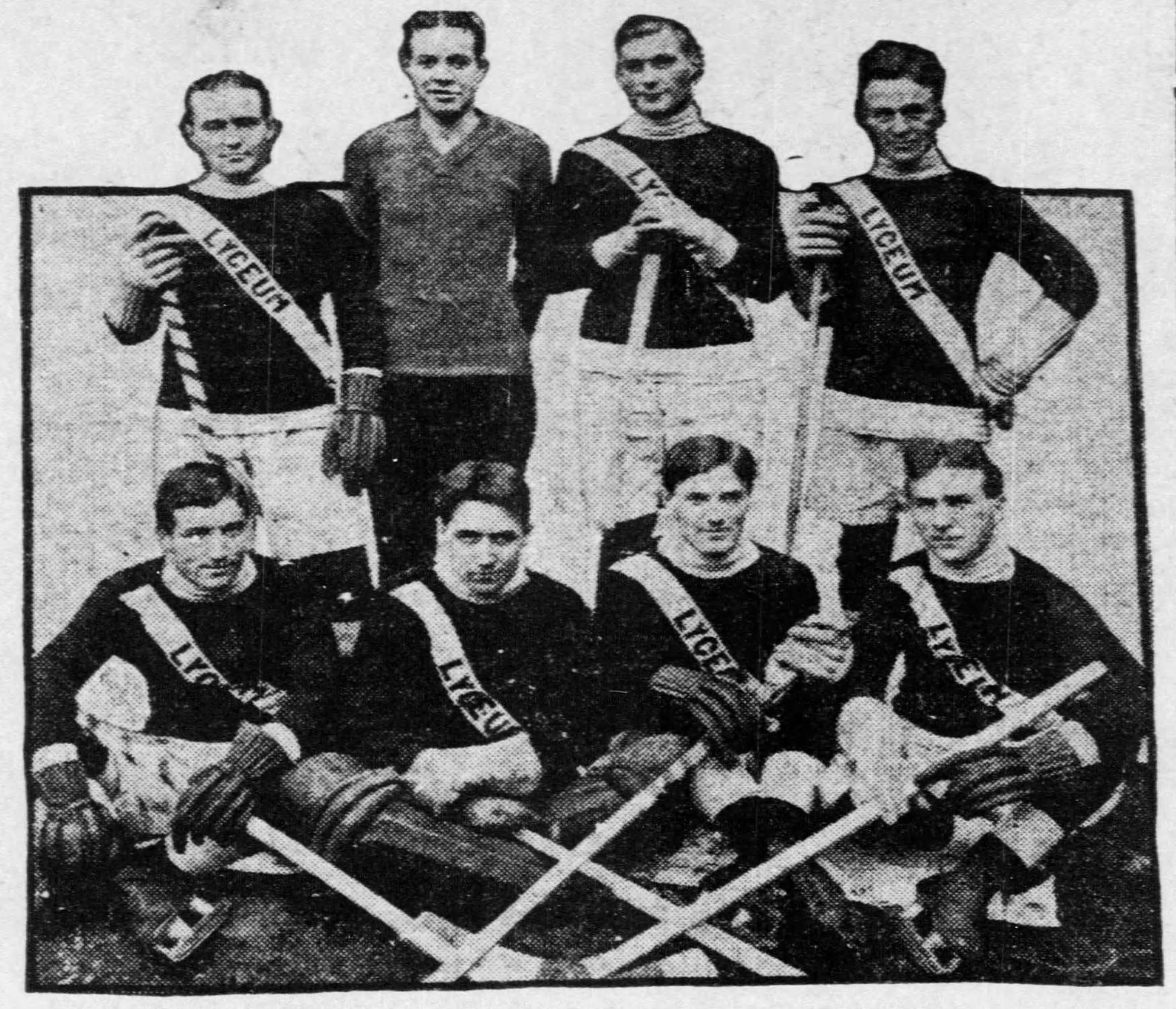
Sixsmith, bottom right, with the Pittsburgh Lyceum in 1908–09.

In 1904, Sixsmith became the first hockey player to use aluminum skates, after he noticed that they were used by speed skaters. Wanting more speed in his game, he had aluminum ice skates custom-made for himself, with a shorter blade. The skates cost him $15, even though his brother and several others told him they would never become popular. The skates eventually helped him earn his reputation as a fast skater. The type of skate developed for Sixsmith soon became the skate of choice for hockey players and are still in use. The original skates were later gold plated by his family and given to him on February 3, 1960, his 50th wedding anniversary.

He joined the Pennsylvania Railroad as a clerk in 1905. After hockey, he continued at the railroad, eventually becoming a superintendent of the Conemaugh Division. In 1915, Sixsmith turned down an offer to coach the Princeton Tigers hockey team. That same year, he played on a team for the Pittsburgh Winter Garden alongside his brother, who was also the team's manager. The team lasted on one year and after the season both brothers ended their playing careers. At this time six-man hockey came to Pittsburgh and the new game did not appeal to Sixsmith. He later stated that the seven-man game "was tougher and had more action". Sixsmith's last connection to hockey came in 1924–25, when he served as the president of the Fort Pitt Hornets of the United States Amateur Hockey Association. On November 16, 1935, Sixsmith dropped the ceremonial first puck, at the Duquesne Garden, for the inaugural home game of the Pittsburgh Shamrocks of the International Hockey League He retired in 1950 and moved to Chautauqua, New York. He became critical of several of the changes to the game. In 1933, he stated to the Pittsburgh Press he couldn't bear watching a team score a goal and then drop back and play defensive hockey. Stating that the best defense was the best offense, Sixsmith felt that teams should keep scoring and pile up the score. He also stated that the referees had too much responsibility and blew the whistle too often. Finally he stated that line changes were occurring to often. Sixsmith felt that pulling a player after being on the ice for 3–4 minutes was unfair since he felt it took that long for a player to warm-up.

== Statistics ==
			Regular season					Playoffs
Season	Team	League	GP	G	A	Pts	PIM	GP	G	A	Pts	PIM
1902–03	Pittsburgh Victorias	WPHL	14	8	2	10	31	–	–	–	–	–
1903–04	Pittsburgh Victorias	WPHL	13	10	4	14	12	–	–	–	–	–
	Pittsburgh Victorias	US Pro	–	–	–	–	–	6	3	3	6	10
1904–05	Canadian Soo	IPHL	3	2	0	2	12	–	–	–	–	–
	Pittsburgh Professionals	IPHL	2	1	0	1	0	–	–	–	–	–
1905–06	Pittsburgh Professionals	IPHL	14	7	0	7	5	–	–	–	–	–
1906–07			–	–	–	–	–	–	–	–	–	–
1907–08	Pittsburgh Athletic Club	WPHL	14	7	0	7	–	–	–	–	–	–
1908–09	Pittsburgh Athletic Club	WPHL	8	7	0	7	–	–	–	–	–	–
	Pittsburgh Lyceum	WPHL	8	4	0	4	–	–	–	–	–	–
WPHL totals			57	36	6	42	43	–	–	–	–	–
IPHL totals			19	10	0	10	17	–	–	–	–	–

Statistics per Society for International Hockey Research at sihrhockey.org
