= 1899–1900 WPHL season =

- League: Western Pennsylvania Hockey League
- Sport: Ice hockey
- Teams: 4

Regular season
- Season champions: Pittsburgh Athletic Club (2nd title)

Seasons
- 1898–99 1900–01

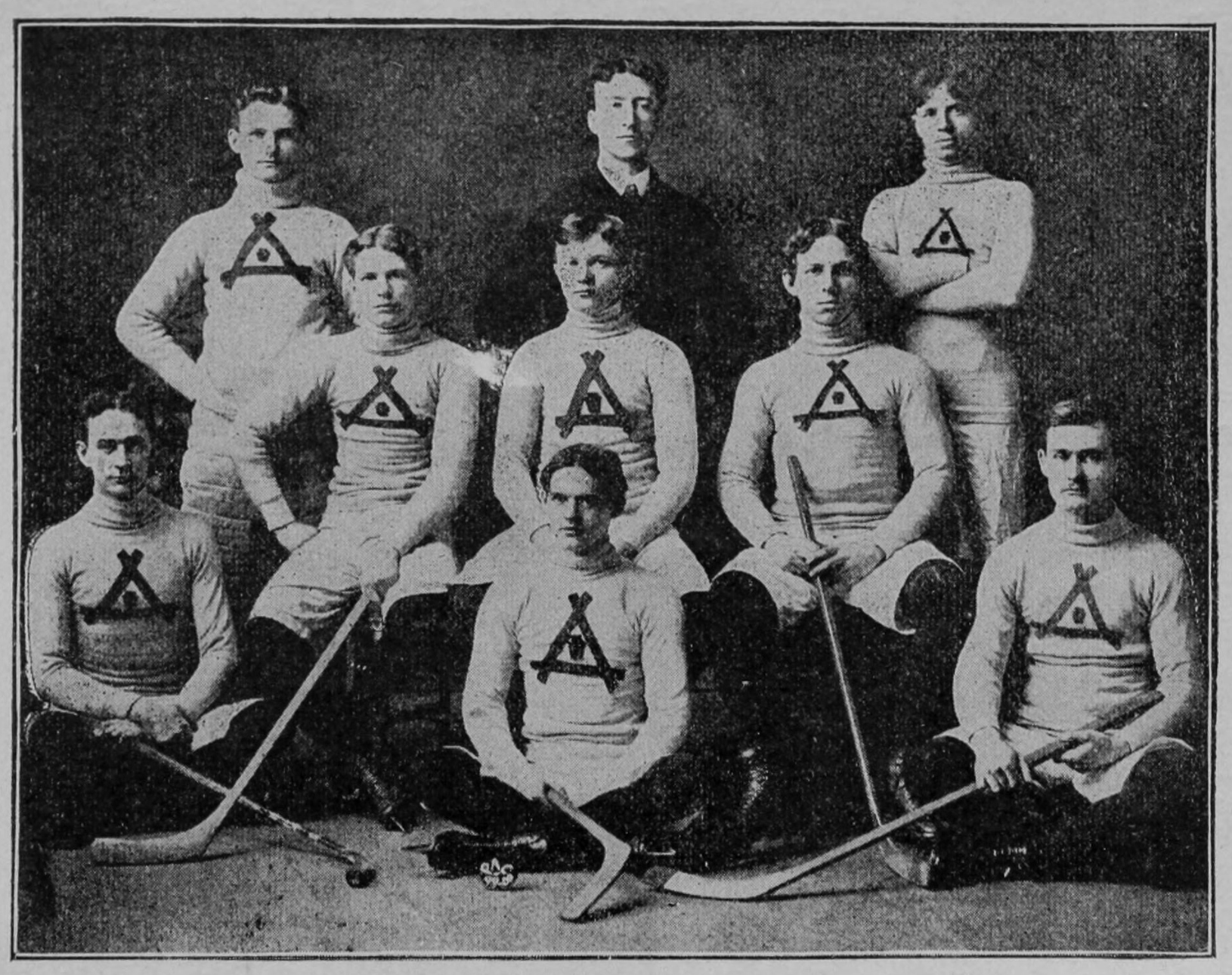
Pittsburgh Athletic Club, league champions

The 1899–1900 WPHL season was the third season of operation for the Western Pennsylvania Hockey League. Four Pittsburgh-area teams competed in the season, in which all games were played at the Duquesne Garden. While the Pittsburgh Bankers were added to the league and began play, the season marked the final year that an amateur team representing Western University, played in the league. The Pittsburgh Athletic Club repeated as the league champions, for their second league title.

== Season ==
=== Final standings ===
Note GP = Games Played, W = Wins, L = Losses, T = Ties, GF = Goals For, GA = Goals Against, PCT = Percentage

Team	GP	W	L	T	GF	GA	PCT
Pittsburgh Athletic Club	17	13	4	0	59	26	.765
Western University of Pennsylvania	18	7	8	3	33	44	.472
Pittsburgh Bankers	17	6	9 (Note: The Bankers protested their January 30 game vs. DC&AC, charging that DC&AC player Ardagh was ineligible. The league decided that the result of the game would be nullified if it affected the standing of the clubs at the end of the season. Although the order of the standings was ultimately unaffected, the Pittsburgh Press and Post disregarded the game anyway, subtracting a win from the DC&AC (changing 6 to 5) and a loss from the Bankers (changing 9 to 8) in their final standings.)	2	39	47	.412
Duquesne Country & Athletic Club	18	6	11	1	40	54	.324

=== Results ===
Month	Day	Team	Score	Team	Score
1899
November	28	Bankers	4	Duquesne C&AC	1
December	1	Pittsburgh AC	3	Western U	0
December	5	Duquesne C&AC	1	Western U	1
December	8	Pittsburgh AC	7	Bankers	1
December	12	Pittsburgh AC	2	Duquesne C&AC	1
December	15	Western U	4	Bankers	2
December	19	Bankers	4	Duquesne C&AC	2
December	22	Pittsburgh AC	4	Western U	1
December	26	Duquesne C&AC	4	Western U	0
December	29	Pittsburgh AC	4	Bankers	0
1900
January	2	Pittsburgh AC	5	Duquesne C&AC	3
January	9	Bankers	3	Duquesne C&AC	2
January	12	Western U	1	Pittsburgh AC	0
January	16	Duquesne C&AC	4	Western U	0
January	19	Pittsburgh AC	3	Bankers	0
January	23	Western U	4	Duquesne C&AC	3
January	30	Duquesne C&AC	3	Bankers	1
February	2	Pittsburgh AC	4	Western U	0
February	6	Pittsburgh AC	4	Duquesne C&AC	2
February	9	Pittsburgh AC	4	Bankers	0
February	10	Western U	1	Bankers	1
February	13	Pittsburgh AC	9	Duquesne C&AC	2
February	16	Western U	3	Bankers	2
February	20	Bankers	5	Duquesne C&AC	1
February	23	Pittsburgh AC	2	Western U	1
February	24	Bankers	1	Duquesne C&AC	1
February	27	Duquesne C&AC	2	Western U	1
March	6	Duquesne C&AC	4	Pittsburgh AC	2
March	9	Bankers	5	Western U	2
March	13	Duquesne C&AC	3	Bankers	2
March	16	Western U	5	Pittsburgh AC	1
March	20	Western U	3	Duquesne C&AC	1
March	23	Bankers	4	Pittsburgh AC	1
March	27	Pittsburgh AC	4	Pittsburgh AC	1
March	30	Western U	5	Bankers	4

== Notes ==
Preceded by 1898–99	WPHL seasons 1899–1900	Succeeded by 1900–01
