= Pittsburgh Pirates (WPHL) =

- City: Pittsburgh, Pennsylvania
- League: Western Pennsylvania Hockey League
- Founded: 1907
- Operated: 1907–1908
- Home arena: Duquesne Garden
- Colours: Blue, White
- General manager: Richard Guy

Championships
- Regular season titles: 0

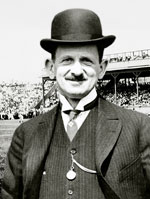
Team president Barney Dreyfuss.

The Pittsburgh Pirates were an early professional ice hockey club based in Pittsburgh, Pennsylvania and were members of the Western Pennsylvania Hockey League for the 1908 WPHL season. The team, and the league, played all of their games at Duquesne Garden. The Pirates made one of the first known trades of professional hockey players.

Team president was local sports magnate Barney Dreyfuss who also owned the Major League Baseball team by the same name.

== History ==
When the WPHL was revived in 1907, the only two original teams to return to the league after operations were suspended after the 1903–04 season were the Pittsburgh Athletic Club and the Pittsburgh Bankers. Two new teams were needed to get the league back to its original number of four teams. One of the teams to enter the league in 1907 was the Pittsburgh Lyceum, and the other was the Pirates. The Pirates entered the league loaded with professional players like Dunc Taylor, Ray Robinson, Ed Robitaille‚ Harry McRobie, Edgar Dey, Charles Masson and goaltender Jim MacKay.

After the 1902 season, the WPHL became the first league to openly hire hockey players. Many of the athletes in the WPHL were Canadians who were drawn to Pittsburgh because of Duquesne Garden, which was one of the few arenas in North America that had an artificial ice rink. The Pirates made one of the first known trades of professional hockey players, sending Jim MacKay, Edgar Dey and Dunc Taylor to the Pittsburgh Bankers for Joseph Donnelly and Bert Bennett on January 27, 1908. (It was not the first trade of the WPHL season, as Dutch Koch had already been dealt from the Bankers to Lyceum for Harry Burgoyne and back to the Bankers for Fred Young.) On January 31 the Pirates also acquired Gordon McGuire from the Bankers through a purchase.

The Pirates played only one year in the WPHL. They ended their only season with a record of 5 wins, 10 losses, and 2 ties.
