= 1896–97 WPHL season =

1896–1897 WPHL season
- League: Western Pennsylvania Hockey League
- Sport: Ice hockey
- Duration: November 17 - December 15, 1896
- Number of teams: 4

Regular season
- Season champions: No title awarded due to destruction of the Schenley Park Casino

Seasons
- ← First season 1898–99 →

The 1896–97 WPHL season was the first season of championship hockey of Pittsburgh's Western Pennsylvania Hockey League. The season opened on November 17, 1896, and was well underway when brought to an end by the destruction of fire of the league's facility, the Schenley Park Casino ice rink on December 17, 1896.

== League business ==
The Casino had installed an artificial ice-making plant in 1895 and the 1895-96 winter season saw the first introduction of hockey at the rink. Challenge exhibition matches of ice polo between the Canadian Queen's University of Kingston, Ontario, and Western University of Pennsylvania were held at the rink, and Queen's demonstrated the game of ice hockey. Between then and November 1896, the Casino management decided to organize two leagues at the rink; an inter-scholastic league for high schools, and a senior league. Both leagues were amateur. The senior league was named the Western Pennsylvania League.

The first league members were Pittsburgh Athletic Club, Duquesne Country and Athletic Club, Western University and the All-Pittsburgh (or simply Pittsburgh) team. The league played twice a week, on Tuesday and Friday nights.

=== Rules ===
The rules of the league were published in the Pittsburg Press on December 20, 1896:

1. The games is played on ice by teams of seven on each side, with a puck of vulcanized rubber one inch thick all through and three inches in diameter. Hockey sticks shall not be more than three inches wide at any point, and not longer than 13 inches long in the blade. A goal is placed in the middle of each goal line, composed of two cages four feet in height and six feet apart, and at least five feet from the end of the ice. The cages shall be firmly fixed. In the event of a cage being displaced, or broken, the referee shall blow his whistle, and the game shall not proceed until the cage is replaced.
2. Each side shall have a captain (a member of his team) who before the match shall toss for choice of goals. Each side shall play an equal amount of time from either end. The duration of championship matches shall not be less than forty (40) minutes exclusive play. The team scoring the greater number of goals in that time shall be declared the winner of the match. If at the end of that time the game is a draw, ends shall be changed and the game continued until one side scores.
3. Timekeepers shall be appointed, one by each captain, to keep time during the match.
4. There shall be only one referee for a match, and in no case shall he belong to either of the competing clubs. He shall enforce the rules, adjudicate upon disputes, or cases unprovided for by rules, control the timekeepers, keep the score, and at the conclusion of the match declare the result. The puck shall be considered in play until the referee stops the game, which he may do so at any time and which he must do so at once upon any irregularity of play occurs, by sounding a whistle. His decision shall be final.
5. A goal shall be scored when the puck shall have passed into a cage and remained there.
6. The game shall be started and renewed by the referee calling "play" after having placed the puck on its surface on the ice between the sticks of the two players (one from each team) who are to face it. After a goal has been scored the puck shall be faced from the center of the ice.
7. A player shall always be on his side of the puck. A player is off-side when he is in front of the puck, or when the puck has been hit, touched or run with by any of his side behind him (i.e. between himself and his own goal line). A player being off-side is put on side when the puck has been hit by, or has been touched the dress or person of any player of the opposite side, or when one of his own team has run in front of him, either with the puck or having played it when behind him. If a player when off side plays the puck or annoys or obstructs an opponent the puck shall be faced where it was last played before the off-side play occurred.
8. The puck may not be stopped with the hand except by the goalkeeper (see rule 11) but may be stopped, but not carried or knocked on by any other part of the body.
9. No player shall raise his stick above the shoulder. Charging from behind, tripping, collaring, kicking, cross checking, or pushing shall not be allowed and a referee must rule off the ice, for any time in his discretion, a player who, in the opinion of the referee, has offended deliberately against the above rules.
10. When the puck goes off the ice behind the goal line, it shall be brought out by the referee to point five yards in front of the goal line, on a line at right angles thereto from the point at which it left the ice and here faced. When the puck goes off the ice at the side, it shall be similarly faced three yards from the side.
11. The goalkeeper must not, during play, lie, sit or kneel upon the ice, he may when in goal, stop the puck with his hands, but shall not throw or hold it. He may wear pads, but must not wear a garment such as would give him undue assistance in keeping goal. The referee must rule off the ice, for any time in his discretion, a player who, in the opinion of the referee, has offended deliberately against the above rule.
12. No change of players after a match has commenced, except by reason of accident or injury during the game.
13. Should any player be injured during a match and compelled to leave the ice, the opposite shall always drop a man to equalize the teams. In the event of any dispute between the captains as to the injured player's fitness to continue the game, the matter shall at once be decided by the referee.
14. Should the game be stopped by the referee by reason of the infringement of any of the rules, or because of an accident or change of players, the puck shall be faced at the spot it was last played before the infringement, accident or change of players shall have occurred.

Source: "Amateur Sports". Pittsburg Press. December 20, 1896. p. 8.

== Season ==
Play continued until December 16, when the Casino rink was destroyed by fire. The Pittsburghs, PAC and Western University teams, and all of the inter-scholastic teams lost their hockey equipment in the fire. The Pittsburghs loss was estimated at $300.

=== Final standing ===
Note GP = Games Played, W = Wins, L = Losses, GF = Goals For, GA = Goals Against, PCT = Percentage

| Team | GP | W | L | GF | GA | PCT |
|---|---|---|---|---|---|---|
| Pittsburgh A.C. | 4 | 3 | 1 | 9 | 5 | .750 |
| Western University | 5 | 3 | 2 | 12 | 15 | .600 |
| Duquesne Country & A.C. | 5 | 2 | 3 | 8 | 11 | .400 |
| All-Pittsburgh | 4 | 1 | 3 | 9 | 8 | .250 |

=== Results ===
| Month | Day | Team | Score | Team | Score | Ref |
|---|---|---|---|---|---|---|
1896
| November | 17 | Duquesne C&AC | 2 | All-Pittsburgh | 1 | |
| November | 20 | Pittsburgh AC | 3 | Western University | 1 | |
| November | 24 | Pittsburgh AC | 3 | All-Pittsburgh | 0 | |
| November | 27 | Western University | 3 | Duquesne C&AC | 2 | |
| December | 1 | Pittsburgh AC | 2 | Duquesne C&AC | 1 | |
| December | 4 | All-Pittsburgh | 7 | Western University | 1 | |
| December | 8 | Western University | 3 | Pittsburgh AC | 2 (OT 5') | |
| December | 11 | Duquesne C&AC | 2 | All-Pittsburgh | 1 | |
| December | 15 | Western University | 4 | Duquesne C&AC | 1 | |

Play was suspended after fire destroyed the Casino rink. No championship was declared.
