= 1907–08 WPHL season =

- League: Western Pennsylvania Hockey League
- Sport: Ice hockey
- Teams: 4

Regular season
- Season champions: Pittsburgh Bankers (2nd title)

Seasons
- 1906–07 (IPHL) 1908–09

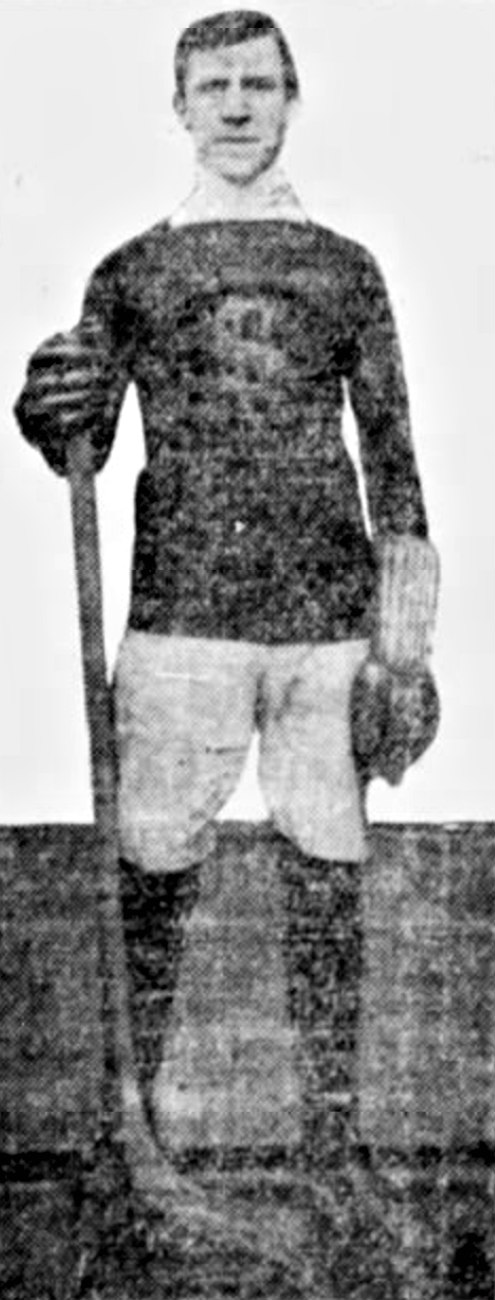
Bert Bennett.

The 1907–08 WPHL season was the eighth season of operation for the Western Pennsylvania Hockey League (WPHL) and the first since the league went dormant in 1904. In the intervening three seasons, a team representing Pittsburgh competed in the International Professional Hockey League (IPHL). Four Pittsburgh-area teams made up the revived WPHL, in which all games were played at the Duquesne Garden. Old WPHL teams Pittsburgh Athletic Club and the Pittsburgh Bankers resumed play in the league. Two teams were added to the league, the Pittsburgh Pirates and a team representing the Pittsburgh Lyceum.

== Regular season ==
With the Pittsburgh Athletic Club woeful from the outset and the Pirates collapsing after a strong start, the championship race narrowed to a duel between Lyceum and the Bankers. In the last regularly scheduled match of the season, the Bankers, one game behind in the standings, beat the league-leading Lyceum 3–1 to force an extra game to break the tie for first place. The Bankers won the tiebreaker game 4–2 behind three or four goals by center Harry Smith. It was the team's second and last league title.

The season saw some of the first, if not the first, recorded trades involving professional hockey players. The Bankers traded Dutch Koch to Lyceum for Harry Burgoyne in December 1907, then in early January reacquired Koch from Lyceum in exchange for Fred Young. A bigger trade took place on January 27, with the Pittsburgh Pirates sending James MacKay, Edgar Dey and Dunc Taylor to the Bankers in exchange for Joseph Donnelly and Bert Bennett. On January 31 the Pirates also acquired Gordon McGuire from the Bankers through a purchase.

=== Final standings ===
Note GP = Games Played, W = Wins, L = Losses, T = Ties, GF = Goals For, GA = Goals Against, PCT = Percentage

Team	GP	W	L	T	GF	GA	PCT
Pittsburgh Bankers	19	12	4	3	81	59	.632
Pittsburgh Lyceum	17	11	5	1	77	49	.647
Pittsburgh Pirates	17	5	10	2	59	70	.294
Pittsburgh A.C.	17	3	12	2	41	80	.176

Source: Fitzsimmons, p. 415

- Games that resulted in a tie were replayed and are not reflected in total points

=== Results ===
Month	Day	Team	Score	Team	Score
1907
December	10	Bankers	2	Pittsburgh AC	0
December	14	Pirates	2	Lyceum	1
December	17	Pirates	6	Pittsburgh AC	2
December	21	Lyceum	2	Bankers	1
December	24	Pirates	8	Bankers	0
December	28	Lyceum	6	Pittsburgh AC	1
December	31	Pirates	4	Lyceum	2
1908
January	7	Bankers	7	Lyceum	5
January	11	Pirates	6	Pittsburgh AC	1
January	14	Lyceum	5	Pittsburgh AC	1
January	18	Bankers	4	Pirates	2
January	21	Bankers	6	Pittsburgh AC	2
January	25	Bankers	2	Pittsburgh AC	2
January	25	Lyceum	3	Pirates	1
January	28	Pirates	4	Pittsburgh AC	4
February	1	Pittsburgh AC	2	Pirates	1
February	1	Lyceum	5	Bankers	5
February	4	Pirates	4	Bankers	4
February	8	Lyceum	6	Pittsburgh AC	5
February	8	Bankers	5	Pirates	3
February	11	Lyceum	5	Pirates	1
February	11	Bankers	7	Pittsburgh AC	2
February	15	Bankers	7	Pittsburgh AC	3
February	18	Lyceum	5	Bankers	3
February	22	Lyceum	3	Bankers	2
February	22	Pittsburgh AC	5	Pirates	3
February	25	Lyceum	5	Pittsburgh AC	4
February	29	Bankers	5	Pirates	4
March	3	Bankers	7	Pittsburgh AC	0
March	7	Bankers	7	Pirates	6
March	7	Lyceum	5	Pittsburgh AC	3
March	10	Lyceum	16	Pirates	2
March	14	Pittsburgh AC	4	Pirates	3
March	14	Bankers	3	Lyceum	1
March	16	Bankers	4	Lyceum	2

== Exhibition ==
The Bankers played a "World's Series" with the Montreal Wanderers. The Wanderers won the series two games to one.

Preceded by 1905–06 (IPHL)	IPHL seasons 1907–08	Succeeded by 1908–09
