= Pud Hamilton =

Canadian ice hockey player

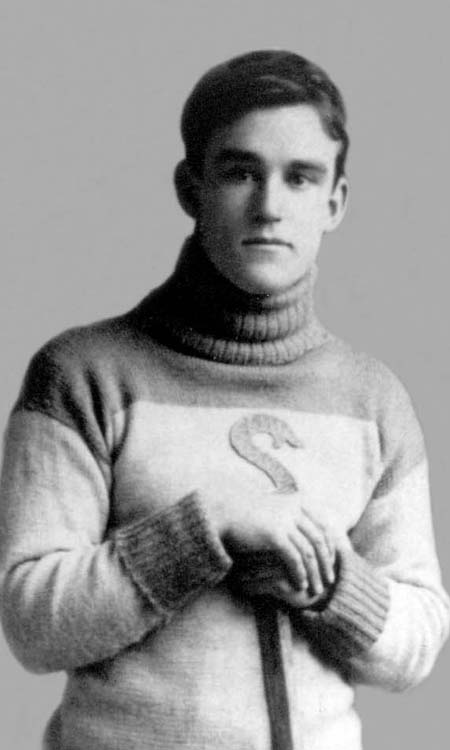
- Hamilton with the Michigan Soo Indians.
- Born: February 10, 1874 Kingston, Ontario, Canada
- Died: October 23, 1965 (aged 91) Sault Ste. Marie, Michigan, USA
- Position: Defence
- Shot: Left
- Played for: Pittsburgh Athletic Club; Pittsburgh Bankers; Michigan Soo Indians; Cobalt Silver Kings
- Playing career: c. 1898–1909

William Edward "Billy, Pud" Hamilton (February 10, 1874 – October 23, 1965) was a Canadian professional ice hockey defenceman who was active in the early 1900s. Hamilton played for the Pittsburgh Athletic Club in the Western Pennsylvania Hockey League, as well as for the Michigan Soo Indians in the International Professional Hockey League. He also appeared in two games with the Pittsburgh Bankers.

Pud Hamilton played with a rough edge to his game and a Pittsburgh Press report from January 1904 says he was released by manager Charles Miller of the Pittsburgh Athletic Club on account of his temper.

He was born in Kingston, Ontario.

== Statistics ==
Exh. = Exhibition games

			Regular season					Playoffs
Season	Team	League	GP	G	A	Pts	PIM	GP	G	A	Pts	PIM
1900–01	Pittsburgh Athletic Club	WPHL	13	3	–	3	–	–	–	–	–	–
1901–02	Pittsburgh Athletic Club	WPHL	14	3	2	5	14	–	–	–	–	–
	Pittsburgh Athletic Club	Exh.	8	1	1	2	8	–	–	–	–	–
1902–03	Pittsburgh Athletic Club	WPHL	13	0	6	6	17	–	–	–	–	–
	Pittsburgh Bankers	US Pro	–	–	–	–	–	2	0	1	1	2
1903–04	Pittsburgh Athletic Club	WPHL	4	0	0	0	10	–	–	–	–	–
	Michigan Soo Indians	Exh.	16	4	0	4	–	–	–	–	–	–
	Michigan Soo Indians	US Pro	–	–	–	–	–	4	0	0	0	2
1904–05	Michigan Soo Indians	IPHL	24	5	0	5	18	–	–	–	–	–
1905–06	Michigan Soo Indians	IPHL	20	7	0	7	34	–	–	–	–	–
1906–07	Michigan Soo Indians	IPHL	23	4	5	9	61	–	–	–	–	–
1907–08	Michigan Soo Indians	Exh.	–	–	–	–	–	–	–	–	–	–
1908–09	Cobalt Silver Kings	TPHL	1	0	0	0	7	–	–	–	–	–
WPHL totals			54	5	8	13	41	–	–	–	–	–
IPHL totals			67	16	5	21	113	–	–	–	–	–

Statistics per Society for International Hockey Research at sihrhockey.org
