= Pittsburgh Lyceum =

Ice hockey team based in Pittsburgh, Pennsylvania

- City: Pittsburgh, Pennsylvania
- League: Western Pennsylvania Hockey League
- Founded: 1907
- Operated: 1907–1908
- Home arena: Duquesne Garden
- Colors: Maroon, White
- General manager: Frank L. Danahey

Championships
- Regular season titles: 0

The Pittsburgh Lyceum Club, or Pittsburgh Lyceum, was a professional ice hockey team based in Pittsburgh, Pennsylvania. It was a member of the Western Pennsylvania Hockey League from 1907 to 1908 and played all of its games at Duquesne Garden.

== History ==
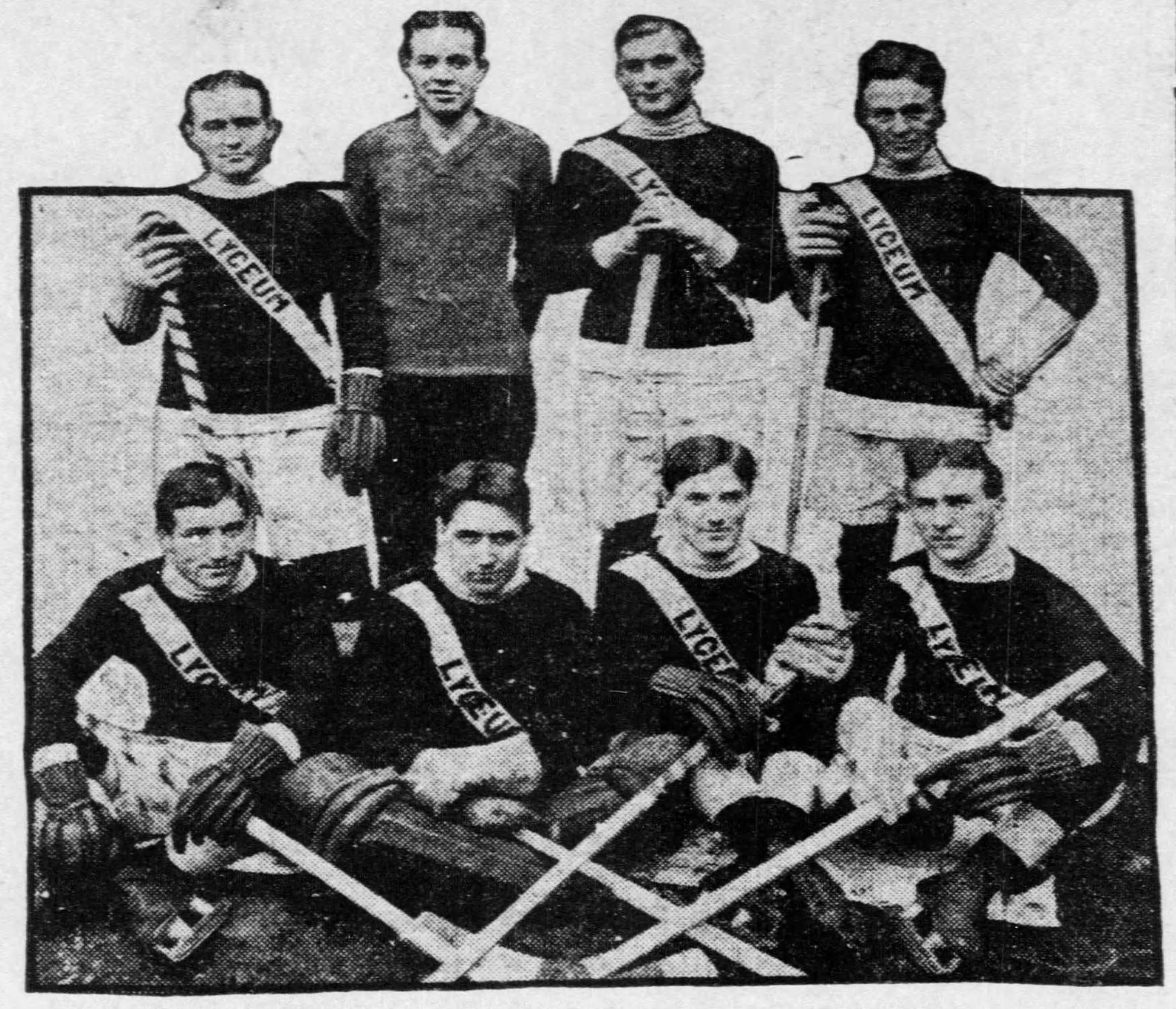
Lyceum in late 1908

After the WPHL was revived for the 1907–08 season, it was determined that two new teams would be needed so that the league could return to its four-team format. That season, the Pittsburgh Pirates and the Lyceum entered the league. During its brief time in the WPHL, the Lyceum team included several notable players such as Jack Marks, Tommy Smith and Garnet Sixsmith. Marks, however, only played in three games for the Lyceum before he jumped to the Ontario Professional Hockey League (OPHL), eventually playing in the Toronto Professional Hockey Club's Stanley Cup challenge. Meanwhile, Sixsmith reportedly scored eleven goals in a game in Pittsburgh, which was considered to be a record for Duquesne Garden. Lyceum player Tommy Smith was later inducted into the Hockey Hall of Fame. In its first year of play, the Lyceum posted an 11–5–1 record, earning second place in the standings.

Unable to rely on a stable line-up, due to the number of league players changing contracts, the Lyceum was forced to fold on December 23, 1908. The WPHL then discontinued after the 1908–09 season.

The broader Lyceum organization, which continued to exist as a multi-sport club, formed another hockey team for the winter of 1920–21 and placed it in the Pittsburgh Amateur Hockey League. The team tied for third in the six-team league with a 4–5 record.

== Prominent players ==
Members of the Hockey Hall of Fame who played for the Lyceum:

- Tommy Smith
