= 1900–01 WPHL season =

- League: Western Pennsylvania Hockey League
- Sport: Ice hockey
- Teams: 4

Regular season
- Season champions: Pittsburgh Athletic Club (3rd title)

Seasons
- 1899–1900 1901–02

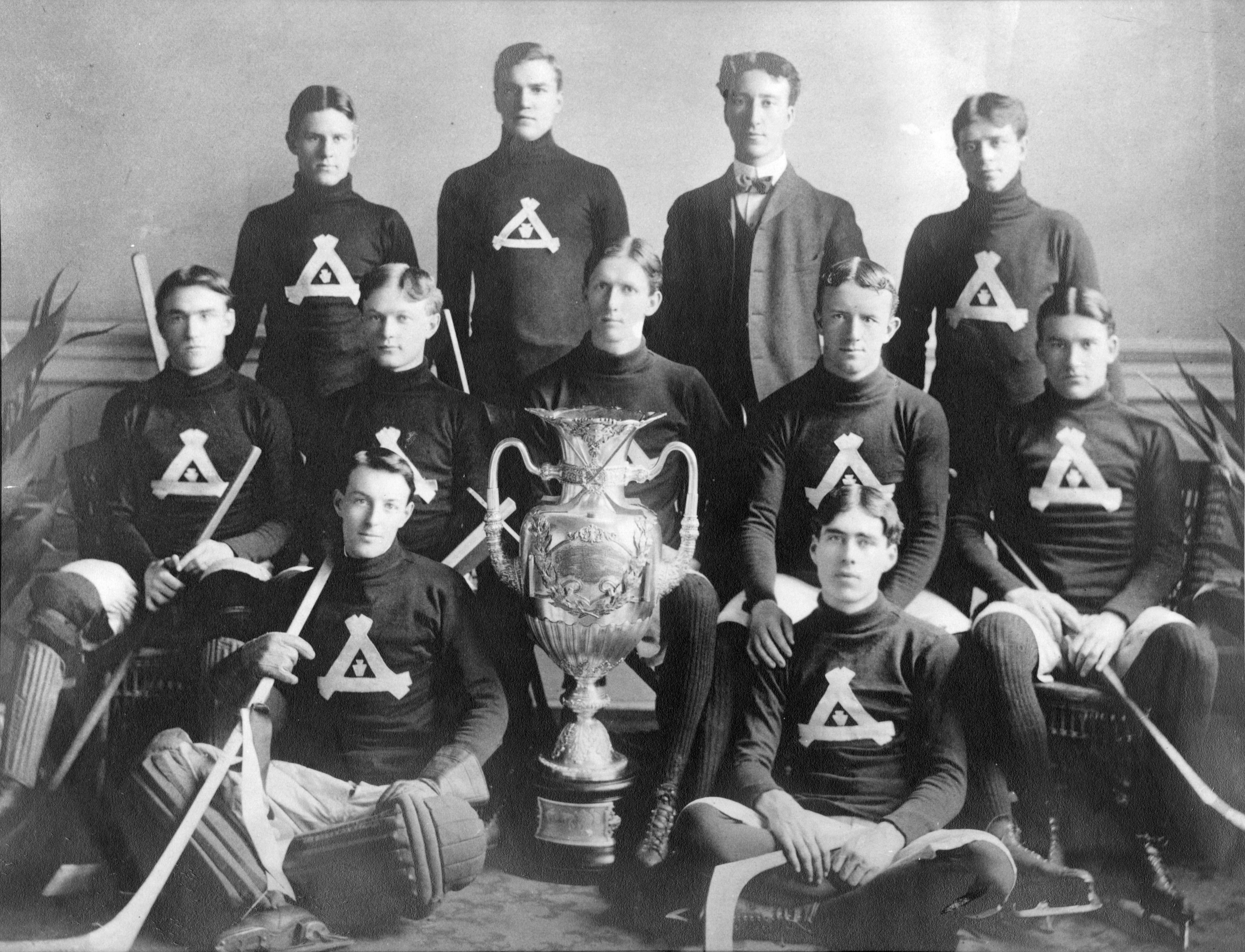
Pittsburgh Athletic Club, league champions

The 1900–01 WPHL season was the fourth season of operation for the Western Pennsylvania Hockey League. Four Pittsburgh-area teams competed in the season, in which all games were played at the Duquesne Garden. The hockey team of the Keystone Bicycle Club was admitted to the league, replacing Western University (today known as the University of Pittsburgh). It was final season of the Duquesne Country & Athletic Club's team.

The Pittsburgh Athletic Club repeated as the league champion to win their third consecutive and final league title.

== Season ==
=== Final standings ===
Note GP = Games Played, W = Wins, L = Losses, T = Ties, GF = Goals For, GA = Goals Against, PCT = Percentage

Team	GP	W	L	T	GF	GA	PCT
Pittsburgh Athletic Club	13	11	1	1	69	19	.885
Pittsburgh Keystones	13	6	6	1	54	43	.500
Pittsburgh Bankers	11	4	7	0	23	48	.364
Duquesne Country & Athletic Club	11	2	9	0	25	61	.182

=== Results ===
Month	Day	Team	Score	Team	Score
1900
November	30	Keystones	3	Pittsburgh AC	2
December	4	Duquesne C&AC	5	Bankers	2
December	7	Duquesne C&AC	5	Keystones	4
December	11	Pittsburgh AC	5	Bankers	3
December	14	Bankers	4	Keystones	3
December	18	Pittsburgh AC	6	Duquesne C&AC	0
December	24	Duquesne C&AC	3	Bankers	1
December	28	Keystones	7	Duquesne C&AC	4
December	31	Pittsburgh AC	4	Bankers	3
1901
January	8	Pittsburgh AC	5	Duquesne C&AC	0
January	11	Pittsburgh AC	5	Keystones	1
January	22	Pittsburgh AC	4	Bankers	3
January	25	Bankers	3	Keystones	2
January	29	Pittsburgh AC	6	Duquesne C&AC	1
January	30	Keystones	6	Bankers	1
February	5	Duquesne C&AC	2	Bankers	0
February	8	Keystones	3	Duquesne C&AC	2
February	26	Keystones	12	Duquesne C&AC	2
March	1	Pittsburgh AC	2	Keystones	2
March	5	Pittsburgh AC	5	Bankers	0
March	8	Keystones	9	Bankers	3
March	12	Pittsburgh AC	15	Duquesne C&AC	1
March	19	Pittsburgh AC	6	Keystones	2
March	29	Pittsburgh AC	4	Keystones	0

Preceded by 1899–1900	WPHL seasons 1900–01	Succeeded by 1901–02
