= Christopher Magee (politician) =

American politician

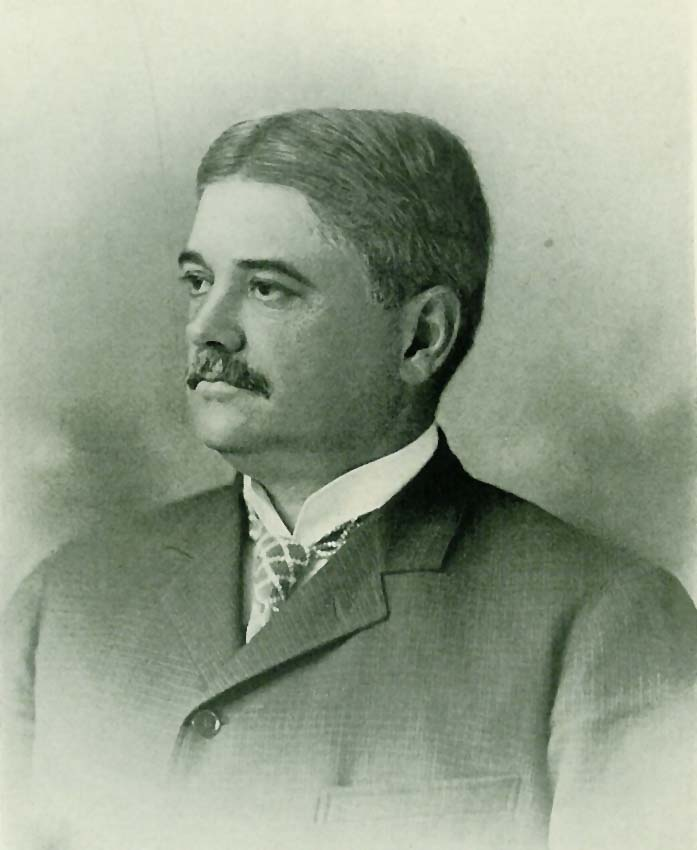
- Christopher Magee
- Born: April 14, 1848; Pittsburgh, Pennsylvania
- Died: March 8, 1901 (aged 52); Harrisburg, Pennsylvania
- Resting place: Allegheny Cemetery
- Education: Western University of Pennsylvania
- Political party: Republican
- Spouse: Eleanor Louise Gillespie (1878–1901)

Christopher Lyman Magee (April 14, 1848 – March 8, 1901) was a powerful political boss in Pittsburgh, Pennsylvania, United States. Along with William Flinn (1851–1924), his political partner, the two ran the Republican Party machine that controlled the city for the last twenty years of the 19th century. He was also a leading philanthropist and hospital patron.

== Early life ==
He was born in Pittsburgh and was educated in the Pittsburgh Public Schools and the Western University of Pennsylvania, today's University of Pittsburgh. When his father died, he became an office boy for the iron manufacturing firm of Park, McCurdy, and Company. By 1864 he took a job in the city controller's office, and in 1869 a better position in the city treasurer's office.

== Politics ==
Magee came from a large family which was prominent in local politics. His uncle, Squire Thomas Steele, had been president of city council and also had run the office of controller. Through Steele's influence, Magee obtained his first jobs in government. At age 22 Magee ran on the Republican ticket for city treasurer, but lost. In 1873, however, he won. He then helped to pass a bill revising property assessments upward, and another bill to collect from tax delinquents. Magee cut city debt in half during his term.

In 1879, in the city's Sixth Ward, one of Magee's brothers ran for office against William Flinn, an upstart in local politics. However Magee and Flinn struck up a partnership, as Flinn eyed a seat in the Pennsylvania General Assembly, and Magee had a natural enemy at the state level, the political boss Matthew Quay. So Flinn became Magee's man. In 1887 the two succeeded in changing the city charter at the state legislature that took the power of appointments away from city council and granted it to department heads. Magee and Flinn also consolidated Republican control within both the city and Allegheny County. Finally, the two were successful in placing public monies into banks and financial markets associated with industrial Pittsburgh's phenomenal growth after the American Civil War. This won them untold favors from big business, especially allowing them to grant jobs to thousands and thus build their political machine. Magee did win two terms to the Pennsylvania State Senate, but his political influence was largely limited to Pittsburgh.

Magee made his early fortune in the local street car industry. He began as president of Transverse Railway Company, secured franchises through his political maneuverings, and eventually gained control over competing lines. He then merged the street car companies into the Consolidated Traction Company, of which he served as president. He also owned much real estate in the city and he served on the boards of many banks and corporations. Magee's chief business partner was Joshua Rhodes, chairman of the National Tube Company, which later became part of U.S. Steel. Magee also served on the boards of nonprofit institutions such as hospitals and universities. In 1895 he donated $125,000 to establish the Pittsburgh Zoo.

In the mid-1890s, Magee helped complete the construction of the Schenley Park Casino, which had the first known artificial ice surface in North America, and was the first place in Pittsburgh where organized ice hockey was played. However the Casino was destroyed in a fire, just 19 months after it opened. Magee then purchased a trolley barn at the corner of Fifth Avenue and Craig Street in 1895, turned it into a 5,000-seat arena and named it the Duquesne Garden. The building hosted its first hockey game in 1899, and became the home of the Western Pennsylvania Hockey League.

When the Democratic minority party supported a sand filtration plant for Pittsburgh's water supply, Magee, Edward Manning Bigelow, and his brother Thomas Bigelow contended over different plans. Magee's maneuvers were in part responsible for the slow adoption of filtration, and the resultant deaths of Pittsburghers from cholera.

== Personal life ==
He married Eleanor Louise Gillespie in 1878. Shortly after their marriage, they moved into a stately home called the "Maples". Under ownership of the Magees, the house was renovated and became a local showplace, where they frequently entertained business and political associates. The house was at the corner of Forbes Avenue and Halket Street in the city's Oakland district. The couple had no children. The Magees were members of the First Methodist Church of Pittsburgh. However, prior to her husband's death, Eleanor became a strong supporter of the Christian Science faith.

== Illness ==
Magee fell ill in 1899 and took a leave of absence for treatment and rest. During this time his partner Flinn became involved in a flap over the rigged bidding system the two had concocted for city contracts. The "lowest responsible bidder" scheme, as it was known, assured that Flinn's company, Booth and Flinn, won most large construction and paving contracts in Pittsburgh and Western Pennsylvania.

Edward Manning Bigelow, director of public works and a cousin of Magee's, was moved by public reform pressure to liberalize specifications for streets, which allowed competition. Flinn retaliated by having city council fire Bigelow. Bigelow's brother Thomas, who had a long grudge against Magee because of "bad" deals involving street car lines, enlisted the help of Matt Quay at the state level. A new bill was introduced in Harrisburg to amend the city's charter, and it passed, effectively dismantling the Magee-Flinn machine.

Magee died on March 8, 1901, at the age of 52 and was buried in Allegheny Cemetery days later. According to University of Pittsburgh historian, Carolyn Carson, thousands of people lined the streets between Trinity Episcopal Church and Allegheny Cemetery, and women all along the route threw flowers and sometimes themselves onto the coffin.

According to the Register of Wills of Pittsburgh and Allegheny County, J.N. Mackrell, his personal property and real estate at his death exceeded $4 million.

== Legacy ==
Like many prominent political leaders of the era Magee is either viewed as a generous saint of a man or a corrupt scalawag, depending on whose view was being expressed.

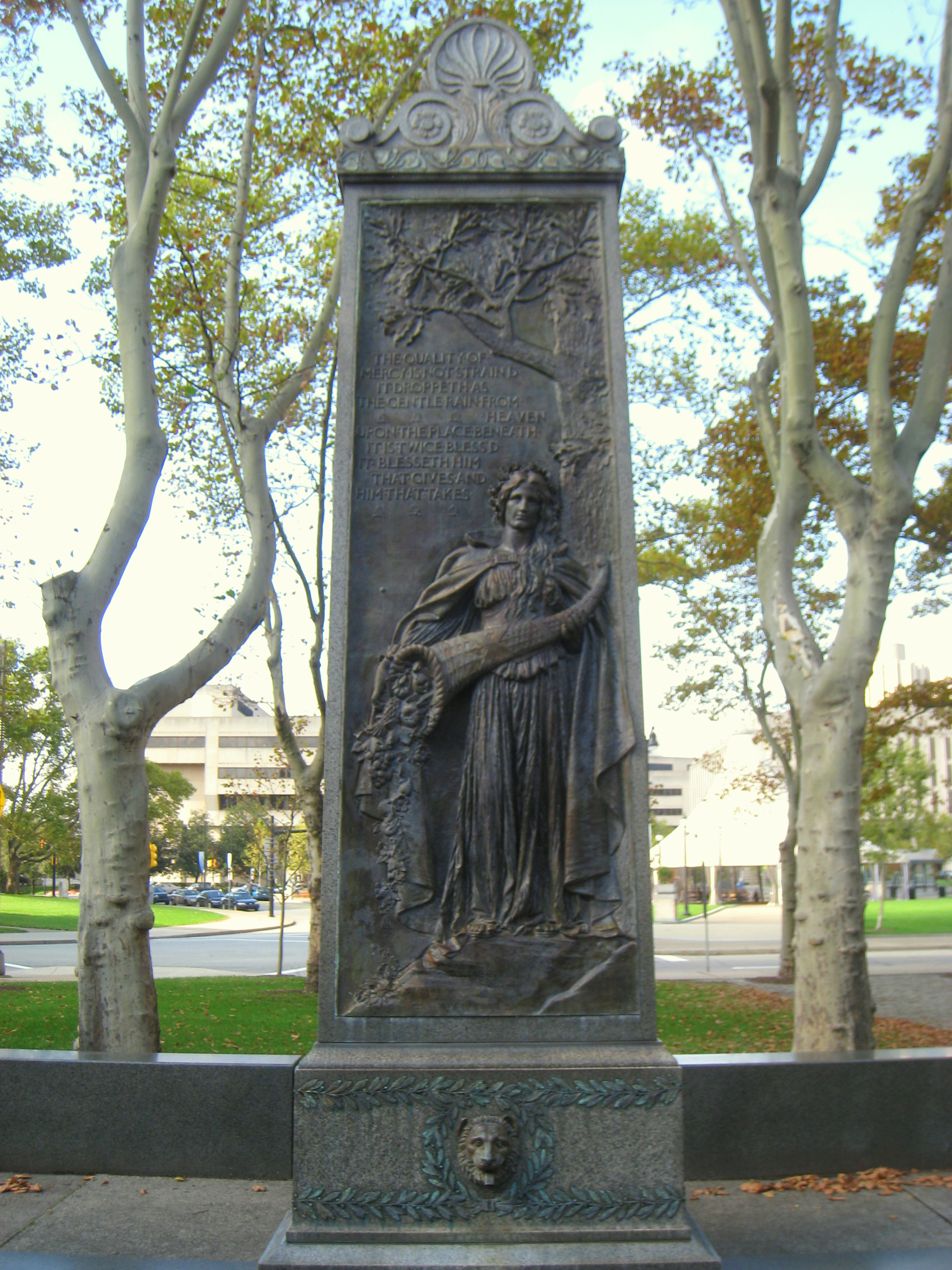
Christopher Lyman Magee memorial, by Augustus Saint-Gaudens

One of the positive opinions of Magee's legacy was written by Stephen Quinon, a journalist who worked for The Pittsburg Times, which Magee owned. According to Quinon, Magee was a benevolent visionary who improved the city and looked out for the underdog. When Magee took on the costly chore of consolidating the city's trolley lines, Quinon said it was done mainly to benefit everyday workers. Better trolley service, he wrote, "induced those who dwelt in crowded quarters to find homes for themselves on the outskirts of the city, where there was pure air, a touch of nature and freedom from many temptations for both young and old." During the Christmas holidays, said another biography located in the archives of Magee-Women's Hospital, "he stood on the steps of the old Fidelity Trust Building and gave silver dollars to young newsboys."

However a starkly different depiction of Magee's influence came from The Shame of the Cities, the landmark 1903 book by Lincoln Steffens on political corruption in American cities. In the chapter "Pittsburg: A City Ashamed", Steffens castigated Magee and his political ally, state legislator William Flinn, for the way they ran the city. "Minneapolis was an example of police corruption," Steffens wrote. "St. Louis of financial corruption. Pittsburg is an example of both police and financial corruption." Steffens wrote about the alleged Flinn-Magee collusion: "Magee wanted power, Flinn wealth.... Magee spent his wealth for more power, and Flinn spent his power for more wealth.... Magee attracted followers, Flinn employed them. He was useful to Magee, Magee was indispensable to him.... Molasses and vinegar, diplomacy and force, mind and will, they were well mated." Reformers eventually reined in Flinn by passing legislation to curb corruption and kickbacks.

As just one example, Steffens wrote about how the Magee machine did favors for businessmen who wanted to expand their plants. "A foundry occupies a block, spreads to the next block and wants the street between. In St. Louis the business man boodled for his street. In Pittsburg he went to Magee, and I have heard such a man praise Chris, 'because when I called on him his outer office was filled with waiting politicians, but he knew I was a business man and in a hurry; he called me in first, and he gave me the street without any fuss.'" Even as he condemned Magee's tactics, Steffens acknowledged his enormous popularity. "Chris, as he was called, was a charming character," Steffens wrote. "I have seen Pittsburgers grow black in the face denouncing the ring, but when I asked, 'What kind of a man was Magee?' they would cool and say, "Chris? Chris was one of the best men God ever made." Steffens concluded. "Magee did not, technically speaking, rob the town. That was not his way, and it would be a carelessly unnecessary way in Pennsylvania. But surely he does not deserve a monument."

Meanwhile, Edward Muller, a University of Pittsburgh history professor, said Magee was a classic machine boss who not only helped shape the city's growth when its industry and population were increasing rapidly, but also ensured his political future by taking care of the many new immigrants flowing into the region. Muller stated that, like other machine leaders, Magee figured out 'that by providing minimal services like a turkey in the pot at Thanksgiving or a load of coal when it was freezing or jobs in contracting companies that paved the streets and put in lighting and sewers, he could in turn get the voters' undying political loyalty." In the end, Muller said, Magee accomplished a tremendous upgrade of the city's infrastructure at the time, with roads, sewers, gas, lighting, the parks system being built. However, Muller states it was done at a cost, a degree of inefficiency, a degree of corruption.

Magee is honored with several monuments throughout the city of Pittsburgh, including one on Schenley Plaza created by the sculptor Augustus Saint Gaudens. His home "Maples" became a maternity hospital in 1911, which continues today as Magee-Women's Hospital of the University of Pittsburgh Medical Center, a hospital for women and their babies, envisioned by Magee in his will. As stipulated, it opened after his wife's death and was named Elizabeth Steel Magee Hospital in honor of his mother.
