= 1908–09 WPHL season =

- League: Western Pennsylvania Hockey League
- Sport: Ice hockey
- Teams: 4

Regular season
- Season champions: Duquesne Athletic Club (1st title)

Seasons
- 1907–08 Final season

The 1908–09 WPHL season was the ninth and final season of operation for the Western Pennsylvania Hockey League. Four Pittsburgh-area teams competed in the season, in which all games were played at the Duquesne Garden.

By 1908, the league could no longer rely on salaries as novelty to attract Canadian talent, since professionalism had spread into Canada. Many players were lured to the league since the WPHL played on the Duquesne Garden' artificial ice and was not dependent on cold weather to provide a naturally frozen surface. However, as winter began and Canadian rinks became available, the players would just return to teams closer to their Canadian homes. This jumping affected all of the league's teams. Once the Pittsburgh Lyceum team folded on December 23, it was decided to discontinue the WPHL after the season. The Duquesne Athletic Club beat the Pittsburgh Bankers in the last game of the season to win the final WPHL championship title.

== Regular season ==
=== Final standings ===
Note GP = Games Played, W = Wins, L = Losses, T = Ties, GF = Goals For, GA = Goals Against, PCT = Percentage

Team	GP	W	L	T	GF	GA	PCT
Duquesne Athletic Club	15	10	4	1	67	45	.714
Pittsburgh Bankers	15	9	4	2	56	50	.692
Pittsburgh Lyceum †	8	4	3	1	31	25	.571
Pittsburgh Athletic Club	14	1	13	0	43	77	.071

Source: Fitzsimmons, p. 415

† Pittsburgh Lyceum discontinued play on December 23, 1908.

=== Results ===
Month	Day	Team	Score	Team	Score
1908
November	12	Pittsburgh AC	7	Bankers	6
November	14	Lyceum	5	Duquesne AC	4
November	17	Bankers	5	Duquesne AC	3
November	21	Lyceum	5	Pittsburgh AC	2
November	24	Duquesne AC*	4	Pittsburgh AC	4
November	28	Bankers	4	Lyceum	4
December	1	Lyceum	6	Duquesne AC	0
December	5	Bankers	5	Pittsburgh AC	4
December	8	Bankers	3	Duquesne AC	3
December	12	Lyceum	6	Pittsburgh AC	1
December	15	Bankers	4	Lyceum	3
December	19	Bankers	6	Lyceum	1
December	19	Duquesne AC	8	Pittsburgh AC	5
December	22	Duquesne AC	4	Lyceum	1
December	26	Bankers	3	Pittsburgh AC	2
December	29	Duquesne AC	7	Pittsburgh AC	4
1909
January	5	Bankers	3	Duquesne AC	2
January	9	Bankers	7	Pittsburgh AC	4
January	12	Duquesne AC	4	Pittsburgh AC	1
January	16	Duquesne AC	5	Bankers	1
January	19	Bankers	5	Pittsburgh AC	3
January	23	Duquesne AC	4	Pittsburgh AC	2
January	26	Duquesne AC	4	Bankers	0
January	30	Bankers	2	Pittsburgh AC	1
February	2	Duquesne AC	11	Pittsburgh AC	3
February	6	Duquesne AC	4	Bankers	2

*Won by forfeit

Preceded by 1907–08	WPHL seasons 1908–09	Succeeded by final season
