= Edgar Dey =

Canadian ice hockey player

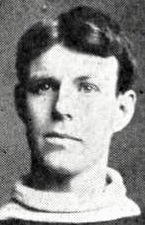
- Born: April 30, 1883 Ottawa, Ontario, Canada
- Died: February 13, 1912 (aged 28) Halifax, Nova Scotia, Canada
- Height: 5 ft 9 in (175 cm)
- Weight: 170 lb (77 kg; 12 st 2 lb)
- Position: Right wing
- Shot: Right
- Played for: MHA: Portage Plains Cities; WPHL: Pittsburgh Pirates; Pittsburgh Bankers; ECHA: Ottawa Hockey Club; NHA: Haileybury Hockey Club; OPHL: Waterloo Colts; MPHL: Halifax Socials
- Playing career: 1903–1912

Edgar Ernest Dey (April 30, 1883 – February 13, 1912) was an early amateur and professional ice hockey player and an athlete in canoeing. A member of the Dey family of Ottawa, known for canoe building, athletics and arena operation, he died in 1912 from an injury while playing hockey. He was a canoeing champion of Canada. His father, Frank Edgar Dey, was a co-owner of the Dey boat-building and Dey's Arena businesses in Ottawa.

== Playing career ==
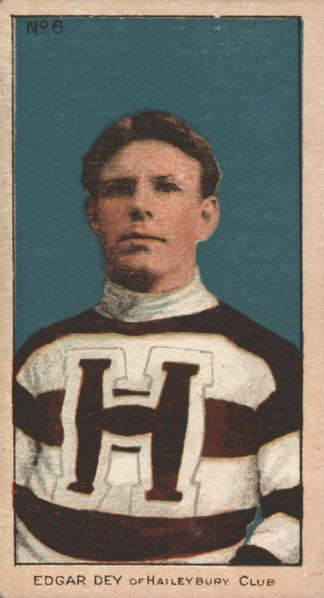
Dey with Haileybury Hockey Club.

Born in Ottawa, Ontario to a prominent sports and boat-building family Dey played junior hockey for the Ottawa Aberdeens in 1900, moving up to the intermediate-level for the two following seasons. Edgar started his senior ice hockey career with the Ottawa Capitals of the Federal Amateur Hockey League (FAHL) in 1904. He then moved out west to play in the Manitoba league, becoming a professional player in 1906. In 1907, he returned east to play in Pittsburgh, Pennsylvania with the Pittsburgh Pirates and Pittsburgh Bankers of the Western Pennsylvania Hockey League.

In one of the first known trades involving professional hockey players, the Pittsburgh Pirates sent James MacKay, Dey and Dunc Taylor to the Bankers for Joseph Donnelly and Bert Bennett. In 1909, he returned home to play for the 1909 Stanley Cup champion Ottawa Hockey Club. He played one season for Haileybury of the National Hockey Association (NHA) in 1910. In 1911, he played for Waterloo of the Ontario Professional Hockey League. In 1912, he moved to Halifax, Nova Scotia to play for the Halifax Socials of the Maritime Professional Hockey League (MPHL).

In a January 5, 1912 MPHL game between the Halifax Socials and Halifax Crescents Dey struck opponent player Patsy Séguin with his stick and was arrested for assault by Halifax police. Dey was charged with "inflicting grievous bodily harm" and released on a $200 bail. On January 10 he was fined $50 by Halifax magistrate's court for the incident.

In February 1912, Dey was hit on the chest while playing a match in New Glasgow. He experienced pain on the return to Halifax. Upon arrival he checked into hospital and had a couple of chest surgeries over the next few days. On February 13 Dey died from his injury. His body was returned by train for burial in Ottawa.

== Career statistics ==
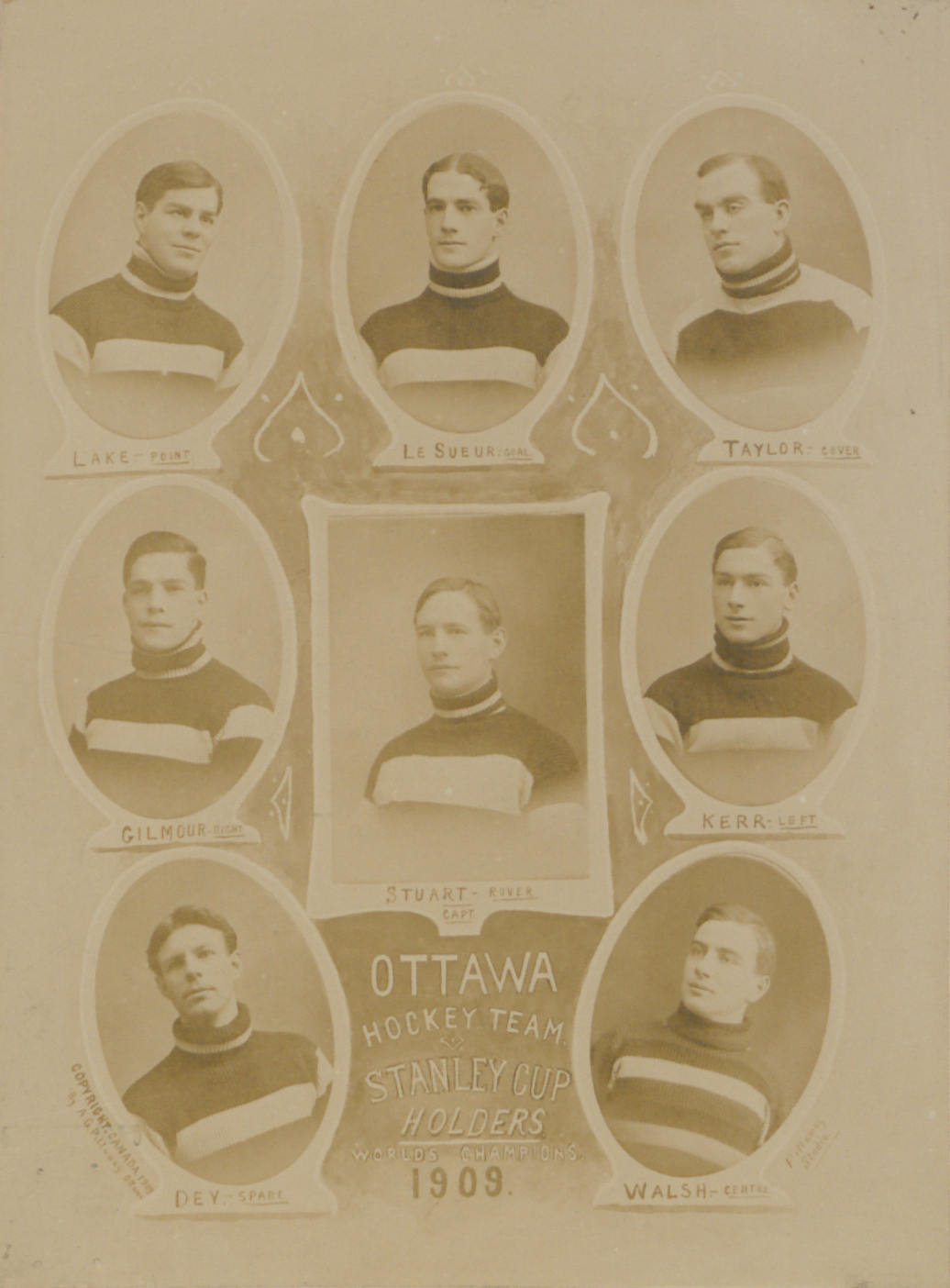
Edgar Dey, at bottom left, with the 1909 Ottawa Hockey Club.

| Season | Team | League | Regular season | | | | | Playoffs | | | | |
| Season | Team | League | GP | G | A | Pts | PIM | GP | G | A | Pts | PIM |
|---|---|---|---|---|---|---|---|---|---|---|---|---|
| 1903–04 | Ottawa Capitals | FAHL | 6 | 11 | 0 | 11 | 9 | — | — | — | — | — |
| 1904–05 | Portage Plains Cities | MHL Sr. | 9 | 10 | 1 | 11 | 15 | — | — | — | — | — |
| 1905–06 | Brandon Wheat Cities | MHL Sr. | 8 | 7 | 1 | 8 | 36 | — | — | — | — | — |
| 1906–07 | Portage Plains Cities | MHL Pro | 8 | 6 | 0 | 6 | 32 | — | — | — | — | — |
| 1907–08 | Pittsburgh Pirates | WPHL | 7 | 2 | — | 2 | — | — | — | — | — | — |
| 1907–08 | Pittsburgh Bankers | WPHL | 12 | 7 | — | 7 | — | 3 | 2 | 0 | 2 | — |
| 1908–09 | Ottawa Hockey Club | ECHA | 7 | 9 | 0 | 9 | 23 | — | — | — | — | — |
| 1909–10 | Haileybury Hockey Club | NHA | 6 | 3 | 1 | 4 | 23 | — | — | — | — | — |
| 1910–11 | Waterloo Colts | OPHL | 16 | 16 | 0 | 16 | 0 | — | — | — | — | — |
| 1911–12 | Halifax Socials | MPHL | 4 | 1 | 0 | 1 | 8 | — | — | — | — | — |

== See also ==
- Ted Dey
- William Dey
