= Western Pennsylvania Hockey League =

American ice hockey league (1896–1909)

- Sport: Ice hockey
- Founded: 1896; 130 years ago
- First season: 1896
- Folded: 1909; 117 years ago
- No. of teams: 3–4
- Country: United States
- Headquarters: Pittsburgh, Pennsylvania
- Venues: Schenley Park Casino (1896); Duquesne Garden (1899–1909)
- Last champion: Duquesne Athletic Club
- Most titles: Pittsburgh Athletic Club (3)

The Western Pennsylvania Hockey League (WPHL) was an originally amateur and later professional ice hockey league founded in 1896 and existing through 1909. Based in Pittsburgh, Pennsylvania, the league became the pre-eminent ice hockey league in the United States. It was the first league to openly hire and trade players.

== Pittsburgh hockey before 1896 ==
In 1895, the Schenley Park Casino was built in Pittsburgh, featuring the first artificial ice-making plant in North America. The 1895–96 winter season also saw the first introduction of hockey in the city. On December 30, 1895, the Pittsburgh Press made mention of a “great international hockey and polo tournament” opening game at the Casino. The newspaper reported that a team consisting of ten players from Queen's University played against a group of local players from Western University (today the University of Pittsburgh) and Pittsburgh Catholic College of the Holy Ghost (today Duquesne University) and a half-hour of exhibition of hockey was played before the polo match. The paper noted that 2,500 to 3,000 fans showed up to watch the game, despite claims of bad weather. No score or records were reportedly kept but the paper did note that the team from Queen's University outplayed the Pittsburghers, who had never played the game before.

== League history ==
=== 1896–1904 ===
The city quickly realized that in order to make money they would need to have more events than just speed skating, family skates and costume parties to make money. They decided that since hockey was a relatively new game, it could catch on in Pittsburgh. Sometime between the Queen's game and November 1896, the Casino's management decided to organize two leagues at the rink; an inter-scholastic league for high schools, and a senior ice hockey amateur league named the Western Pennsylvania League.

Interior of the Casino in 1895. This is the earliest known image of ice hockey in Pittsburgh

The league played its first season in 1896–97 at the Casino, with four teams—the Pittsburgh Athletic Club (PAC), the Duquesne Country & Athletic Club, Western University of Pennsylvania (the University of Pittsburgh today) and a team known as Pittsburgh, or the 'Casino' team. The PAC was managed by Charles S. Miller, who became the league's president.

The league played at the Casino twice a week, on Tuesday and Friday nights. The first "big league" season game was November 17, 1896 between Duquesne and Pittsburgh ('Casino'), won by Duquesne 2–1. Play continued until December 16, when the Casino rink was destroyed by fire, along with the hockey equipment of most of the teams. The league dissolved without a championship.

The league would remain dormant until 1899 and the erection of a hockey rink at the Duquesne Garden. The league was revived with three teams, the Pittsburgh Athletic Club, Duquesne Country & Athletic Club and Western University. The PAC won the league's first championship. The following season the Pittsburgh Bankers, which represented a bankers' association, were admitted to the league, while the Pittsburgh Athletic Club repeated as champions.

In 1900, the Keystone Bicycle Club was admitted to the league, replacing Western University. The Keystones were instrumental in changing the league from amateur to professional, and were the first WPHL team to recruit heavily from Canada. The Pittsburgh Athletic Club won its third consecutive championship, although the Keystones were instantly competitive. Arthur Sixsmith, a former member of the Ottawa Senators, came to the WPHL in 1901 and soon convinced several Canadian players, including his brother Garnet Sixsmith, to join him. In one memorable game that occurred during this era, the WPHL's Garnet Sixsmith scored 11 goals in a game at Duquesne Garden.

==== First professional players ====
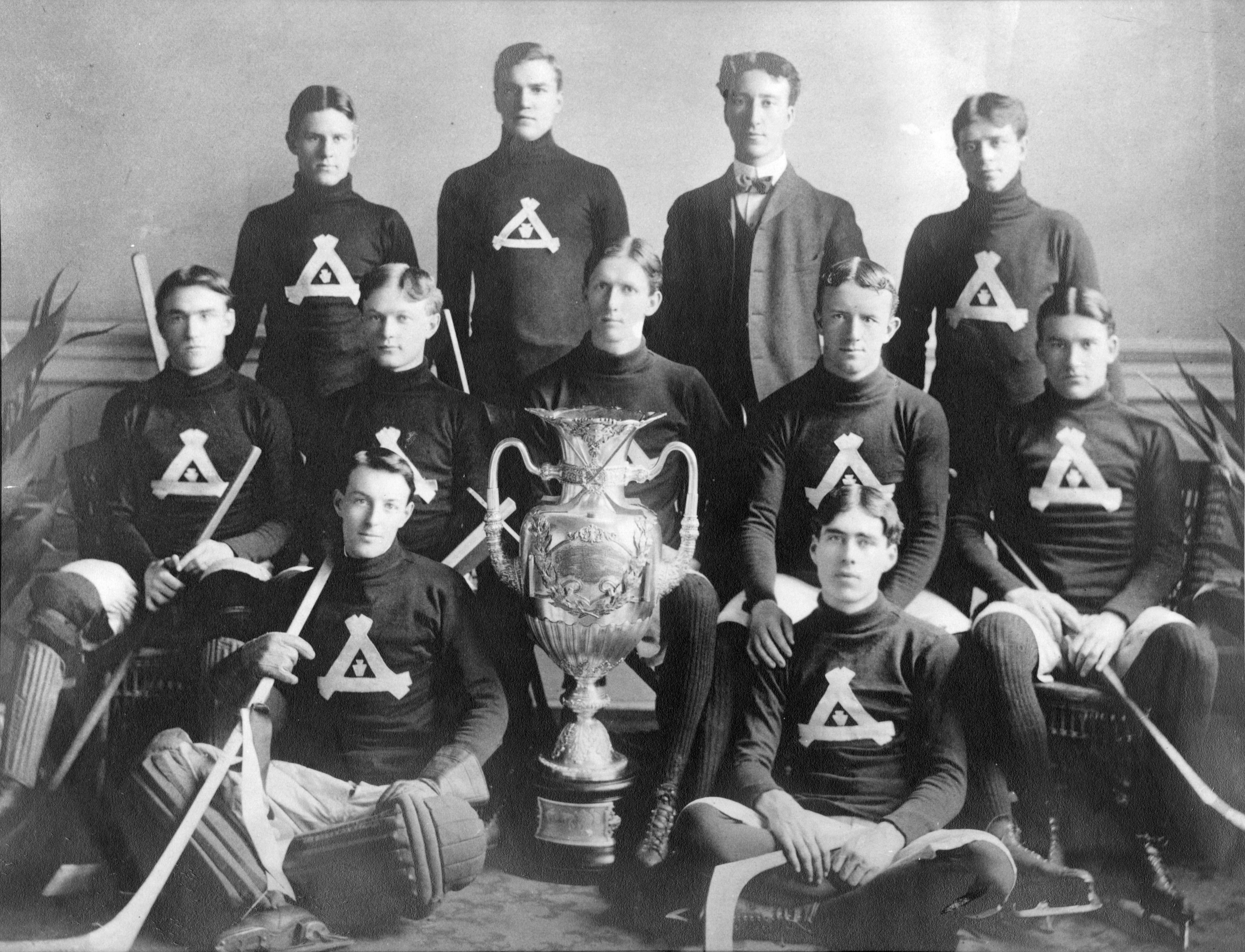
Pittsburgh Athletic Club, 1901 WPHL Champions

The 1901–02 season is considered the first season whereby the league was recognized as professional, the first professional ice hockey league. The league had three teams in 1901–02: Pittsburgh Bankers, Pittsburgh Athletic Club and the Pittsburgh Keystones. To fill these teams, many business and organizations imported young Canadians like George "Pinky" Lamb and William "Pud" Hamilton and set up teams.

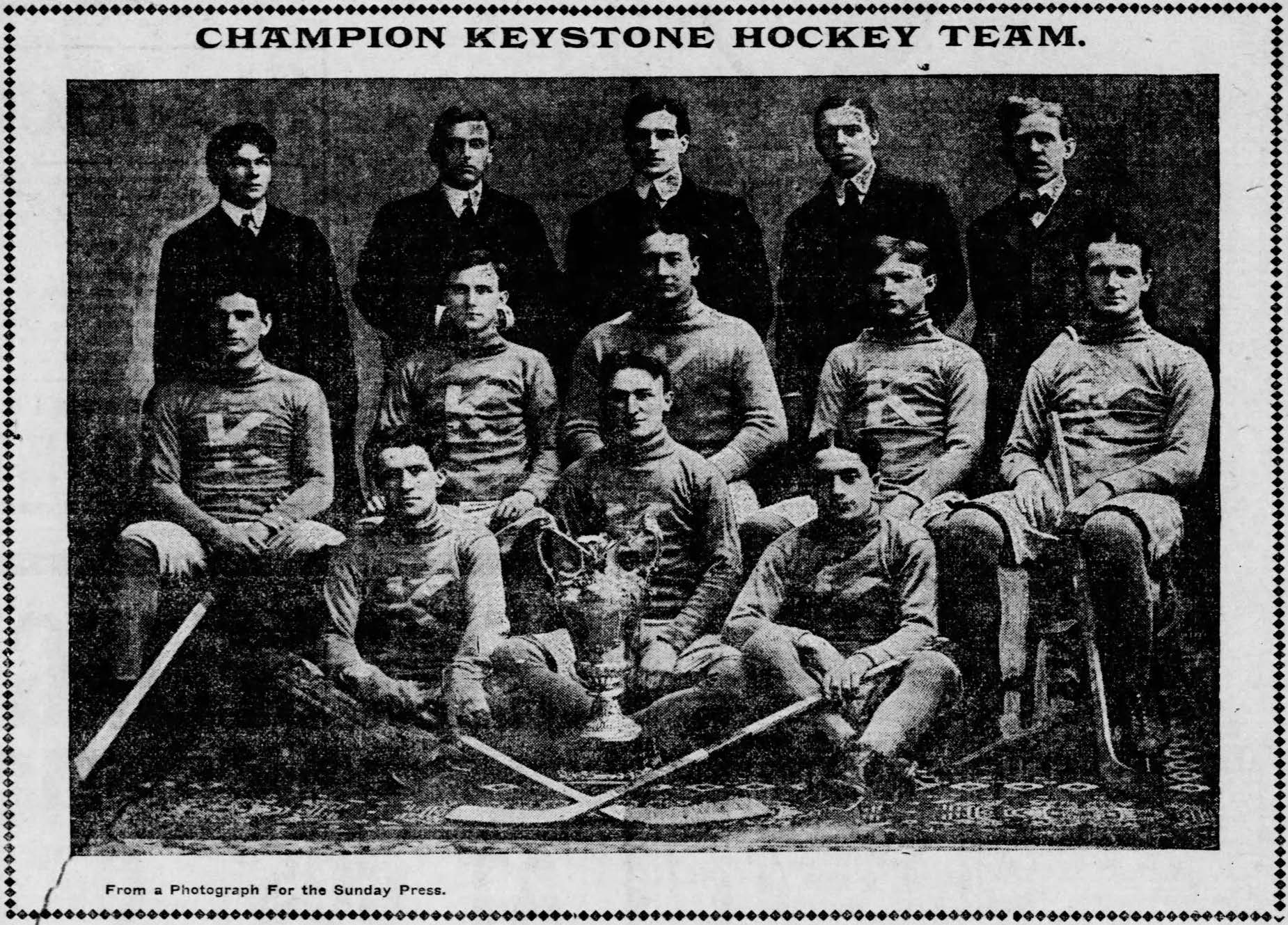
The Pittsburgh Keystones, 1902 WPHL Champions

The league lured players from Canada with promises of high-paid employment and small cash incentives, which was around $30 a week. At this time all Canadian associations were still amateur, and since many of the players had been already expelled from hockey in Canada for being professionals. However, according to Garnet Sixsmith, who played in the league between 1902 and 1909, the players were paid between $10–$15 a week and each were given jobs on the side. Each team, consisted of a manager who was paid a lump sum of money to have a team on the ice. The less money the manager had to pay his players, the more money that manager got to keep. As a result, the Pittsburgh teams were able to get many great players such as future Hall of Famers Alf Smith, Hod Stuart and Riley Hern. These players played for pay in Pittsburgh, eventually forcing the Canadian leagues to go pro in 1907, a development that led directly to the formation of the National Hockey League in 1917.

However, in the summer of 1902 Harry Peel, a Keystones player in 1901–02, admitted that he was paid $35 a week to play in the so-called amateur league and so no amateur teams would play against these teams again without being suspended by either Canadian, or U.S. officials. Peel was suspended by the Ontario Hockey Association and an appeal was rejected on December 10, 1903 and again on November 30, 1904. According to Peel, "They (the teams) make no bones whatever about paying men. If they do not pay them they give them fake (business) positions". However, by the start of the 1902–03 season the WPHL was now a fully professional league with the Pittsburgh Victorias making a fourth WPHL team. More great stars were enticed to come to Pittsburgh as they could accept pay for play. Bruce and Hod Stuart became major stars in 1902–03. While players like Fred Lake, were already well known to hockey fans. There is still a strong suspicion that hockey players were paid before 1904, when the first pro league was officially formed.

=== Suspension of the league: 1904–1906 ===
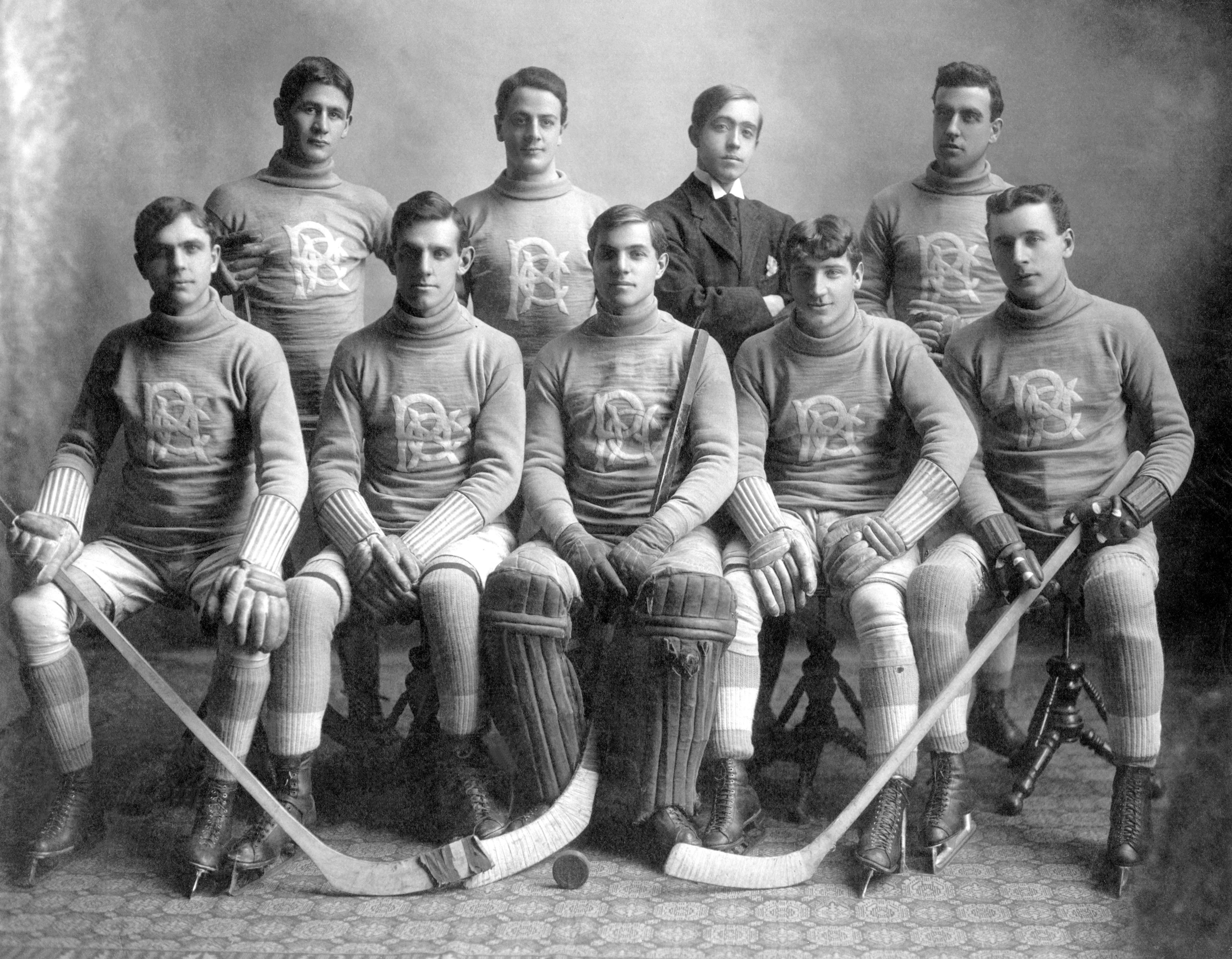
The Pittsburgh Professionals represented the city in the International Professional Hockey League, after the WPHL suspended operations in 1904

The champion of the WPHL competed against Houghton, Michigan's Portage Lakes Hockey Club for the "Pro Championship of the United States" prior to the formation of the International Professional Hockey League for the 1904–05 season. Portage Lakes played off with the Pittsburgh Bankers. Portage Lakes won the four game series 2–1 with a game tied, but they were outscored 11–6. The next season, Portage Lakes continued to play Pro exhibition games, but raided Pittsburgh's teams for top players like Riley Hern and Bruce Stuart.

Despite these losses the WPHL started with the same four clubs, but the Keystones withdrew from the league on January 17, 1904. The team's players were then dispersed to the other three teams. Many other promising young players took their place and three different Pittsburgh teams challenged Portage Lakes for the U.S. Pro title that year. The league champion Victorias put up the best battle, losing two games to one.

In 1904, the first inter-city professional league was formed called the International Professional Hockey League (IHL). The WPHL was suspended with the most skilled players joining the Pittsburgh Professionals and playing in the International Professional Hockey League. Over half of the players in the league had played in Pittsburgh at one time, so the early league a key pioneer in the development of professional hockey. Around 1904 another milestone was reached by a Pittsburgh player. That year Garnet Sixsmith, who played in the WPHL, became the first hockey player to use aluminum skates, after he noticed that they were used by speed skaters. Wanting more speed in his game, Garnet then had aluminum ice skates custom-made with a shorter blade, for himself. The skates costs $15, even though his brother and several others told him they would never become popular. The skates eventually helped him earn his reputation as a fast skater. The type skate developed for Garnet soon became used by the skate of choice for hockey players and are still in use. However, the Pittsburgh Professionals didn't fare too well during the league's first season. But in 1905–06, they were part of a great three team race with Portage Lakes and the Michigan Soo Indians for first place.

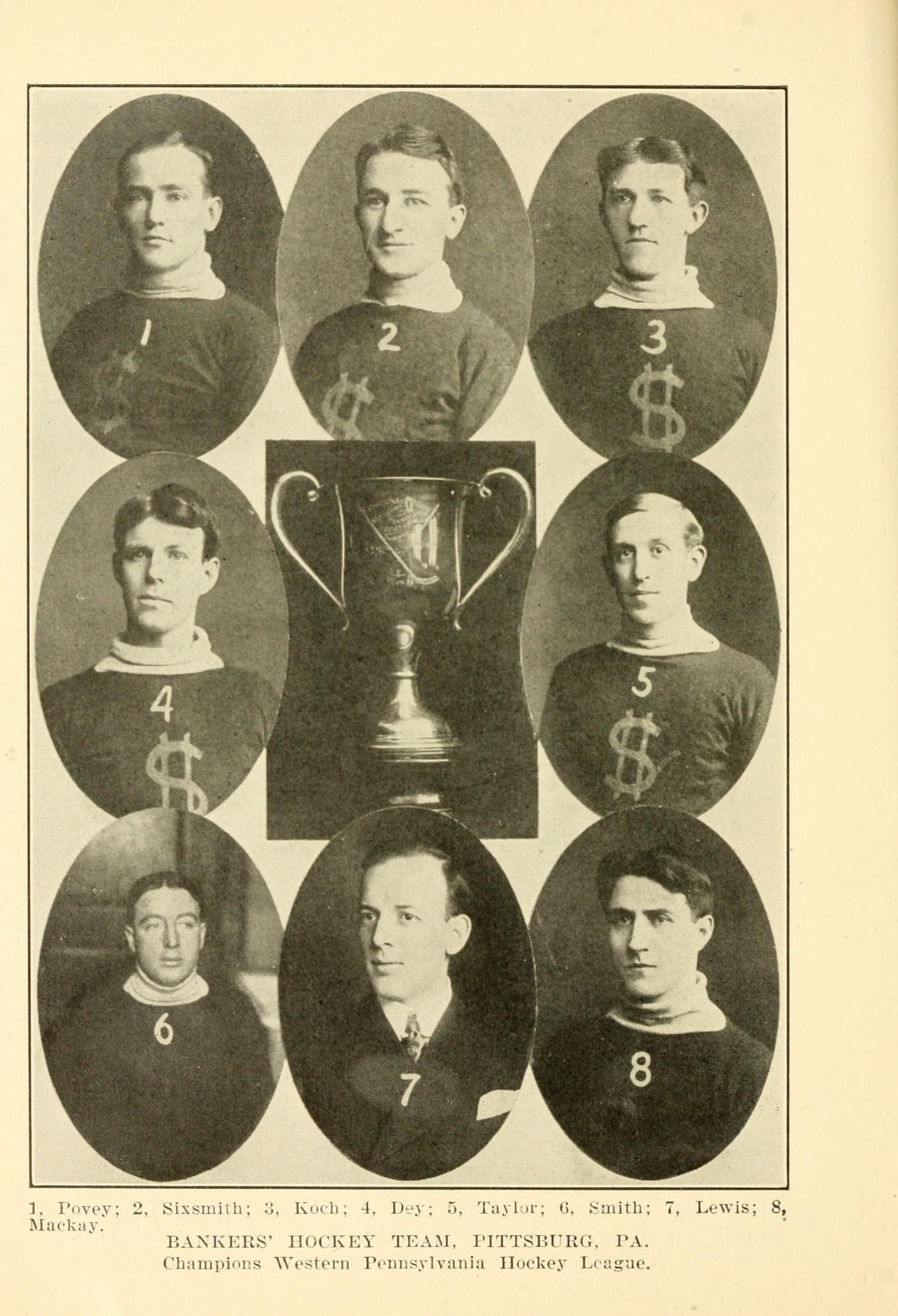
Pittsburgh Bankers, 1908 WPHL Champions

=== The WPHL revived: 1907–1908 ===
Within two years of play, professional leagues were now popping up all over Canada and most of the great players went back home for a better pay day, so the IHL folded. It was decided to revive the four team WPHL for the 1907–08 season, which started several weeks before the Canadian leagues, since there were no artificial ice rinks in Canada until 1911. The WPHL was revived in 1907. The league consisted of the Pittsburgh Lyceum, Pittsburgh Athletic Club, Pittsburgh Bankers and the newly formed Pittsburgh Pirates. The revived league still had some great stars like Albert Kerr and Art Throop, but many of the players got better offers from the Canadian leagues in late December and the team lineups were patched together at best to complete the season.

==== First pro hockey trades ====
In what might have been the first trades involving professional hockey players, the Lyceum dealt Harry Burgoyne to the Bankers for Dutch Koch in December 1907 and returned Koch to the Bankers in exchange for Fred Young in early January. A bigger trade occurred on January 27, 1908, when the Pirates sent James MacKay, Edgar Dey and Dunc Taylor to the Bankers for Joseph Donnelly and Bert Bennett. Later, on January 31, the Pirates also purchased Gordon McGuire from the Bankers.

=== Decline: 1909 ===
By the 1908–09 season, the WPHL found that it could no longer rely on salaries as novelty to attract Canadian talent, since professionalism had spread into Canada. The start of the season brought promise, with Alf Smith, Arthur Sixsmith, Lorne Campbell and goalie James MacKay in charge of the four teams, but by late December fully one-third of the league's players had accepted offers to play in different leagues.

Many players initially signed up for the WPHL because the league played all of its games on Duquesne Garden's artificial ice and was not dependent on cold weather to provide a naturally frozen surface. As winter began and Canadian rinks became available, some players flocked north to teams closer to home. The WPHL saw the mid-season defections of stars like Tommy Smith, Albert Kerr, Harry Smith, Cyclone Taylor and Con Corbeau to Canada.

== Legacy ==
The WPHL was the first league to openly hire hockey players, and may have been involved in the first trade involving professional hockey players. Several of league's alumni continued to make hockey history on both local and national stage. In 1915, the WPHL's Arthur Sixsmith managed an ice hockey team for Pittsburgh's Winter Garden at Exposition Hall. Several of the players on that team began their careers in the WPHL, including Arthur's brother Garnet Sixsmith. The team lasted on only one season. Also in 1915, Roy Schooley, a referee in the WPHL, formed the Pittsburgh Yellow Jackets, which won two United States Amateur Hockey Association titles in 1924 and 1925, before morphing into the Pittsburgh Pirates of the NHL. In 1920, Schooley also put together the very first U.S. Olympic ice hockey team. On November 16, 1935, Garnet Sixsmith dropped the ceremonial first puck, honoring the WPHL, at Duquesne Garden, for the inaugural home game of the Pittsburgh Shamrocks of the International Hockey League.

== Teams ==
Timeline of WPHL teams by season

Teams that played in the WPHL include:

- All-Pittsburgh / Casino (1896)
- Duquesne Athletic Club (1908–1909)
- Duquesne Country and Athletic Club (1896–1901)
- Pittsburgh Athletic Club (1896–1904, 1907–1909)
- Pittsburgh Bankers (1899–1904, 1907–1909)
- Pittsburgh Keystones (1900–1904)
- Pittsburgh Lyceum (1907–1908)
- Pittsburgh Pirates (1907–1908)
- Pittsburgh Victorias (1902–1904)
- Western University of Pennsylvania (1896–1900)

== Seasons ==
Season	Teams	Champion
1896–97	Pittsburgh AC, Western University, Duquesne C&AC, All-Pittsburgh	none (owing to Casino fire)
1898–99	Pittsburgh AC, Western University, Duquesne C&AC	Pittsburgh AC
1899–1900	Pittsburgh AC, Bankers, Western University, Duquesne C&AC	Pittsburgh AC
1900–01	Pittsburgh AC, Bankers, Keystones, Duquesne C&AC	Pittsburgh AC
1901–02	Pittsburgh AC, Bankers, Keystones	Keystones
1902–03	Pittsburgh AC, Bankers, Keystones, Victorias	Bankers
1903–04	Pittsburgh AC, Bankers, Keystones*, Victorias	Victorias
1907–08	Pittsburgh AC, Bankers, Lyceum, Pirates	Bankers
1908–09	Pittsburgh AC, Bankers, Lyceum*, Duquesne AC	Duquesne AC

* Disbanded during season

== Prominent players ==
The following players are members of the Hockey Hall of Fame:

- Riley Hern (1962, Keystones)
- Alf Smith (1962, Pittsburgh Athletic Club/Bankers/Duquesne Athletic Club)
- Tommy Smith (1973, Lyceum/Bankers)
- Bruce Stuart (1961, Victorias)
- Hod Stuart (1945, Bankers)
- Cyclone Taylor (1947, Pittsburgh Athletic Club)

== See also ==
- International Professional Hockey League

== References and notes ==
- Mason, Daniel S. (Spring 1998). "The International Hockey League and the Professionalization of Ice Hockey, 1904-1907" (PDF). Journal of Sport History. 25 (1): 1–17. Archived from the original (PDF) on 2010-08-07.
- Diamond, Dan (1998). Total Hockey: The Official Encyclopedia of the National Hockey League. Total Sports. ISBN 1894963164.
