= Pittsburgh Athletic Club =

- City: Pittsburgh, Pennsylvania
- League: Western Pennsylvania Hockey League
- Operated: 1895–1905, 1907–1909
- Home arena: Duquesne Garden (1899–1909); Schenley Park Casino (1895–1896)
- Colors: Red (crimson) and white
- General manager: Charles Miller
- Captain: Harry Stoebener (1899–1900)

Championships
- Regular season titles: (3) 1898–99, 1899–1900, 1900–01

The Pittsburgh Athletic Club (PAC) was one of the earliest professional ice hockey teams. It was based in Pittsburgh, Pennsylvania from around 1895 until 1905 and again from 1907 to 1909.

The team was a member of the Western Pennsylvania Hockey League, which was formed in 1896.

== History ==
=== Origins ===
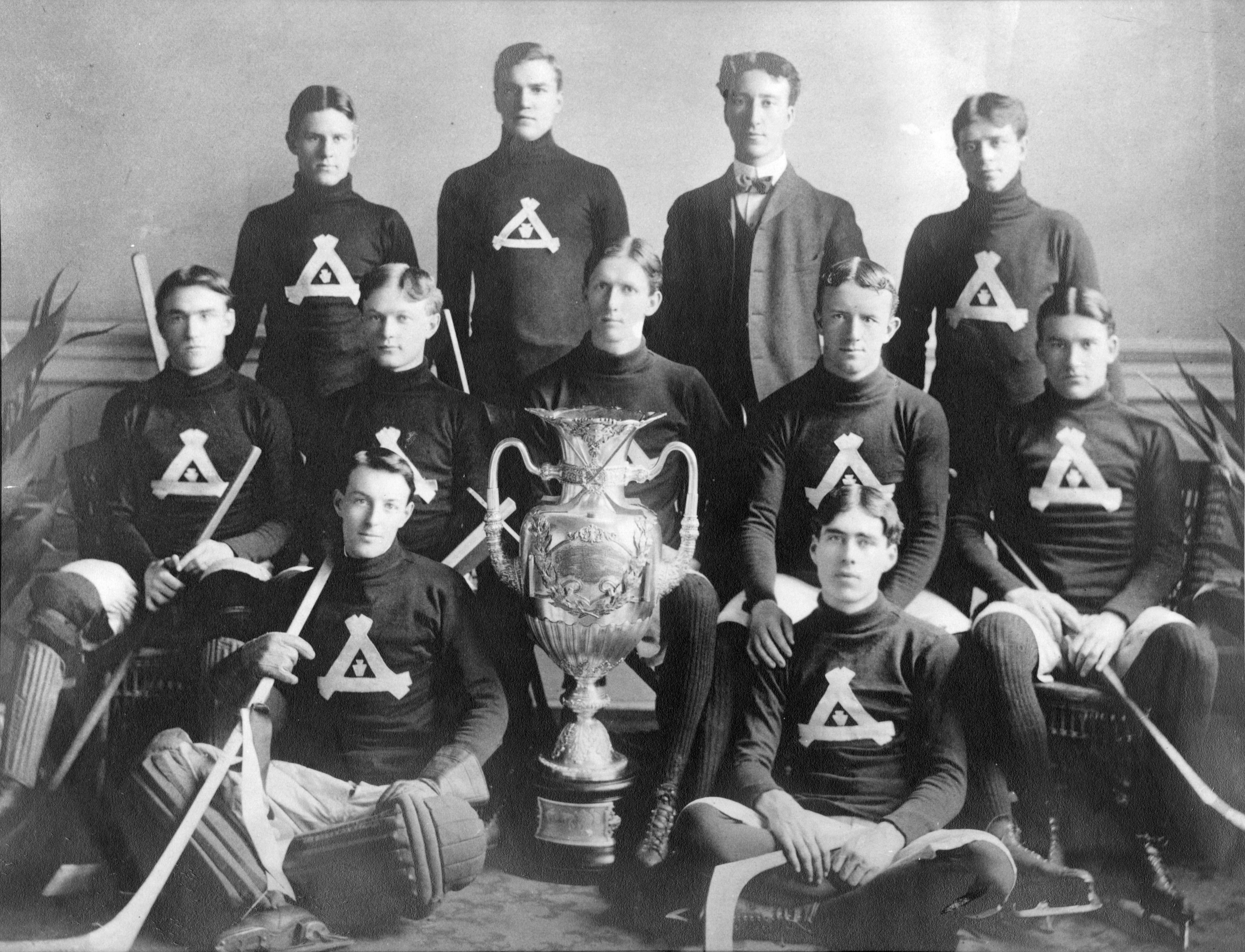
Pittsburgh Athletic Club, 1899, 1900 and 1901 WPHL Champions

In 1895, Pittsburgh officials, constructed the Schenley Park Casino which featured the first artificial ice-making plant in North America. The 1895–96 winter season also saw the first introduction of hockey in the city.

On December 30, 1895, the Pittsburgh Press made mention of a “great international hockey and polo tournament” opening game at the Casino. The newspaper reported that a team consisting of ten players from Queen's University played against a group of local players from Western University (today the University of Pittsburgh) and Pittsburgh Catholic College of the Holy Ghost (today Duquesne University) and a half-hour of exhibition of hockey was played before the polo match. The paper noted that 2,500 to 3,000 fans showed up to watch the game, despite claims of bad weather. No score or records were reportedly kept but the paper did note that the team from Queen's University outplayed the Pittsburghers, who had never played the game before.

After seeing the excitement and fan appeal of the hockey game, the Casino's management decided to organize a senior league at the rink. The league was strictly amateur and was named the Western Pennsylvania League. The league played its first season in 1896–97 at the Casino, with four teams, the Pittsburgh Athletic Club, the Duquesne Country & Athletic Club, Western University of Pennsylvania (the University of Pittsburgh today) and a team known as (All-)Pittsburgh, or the "Casino" team. The Pittsburgh Athletic Club team was managed by Charles S. Miller, who became the league's president.

=== Championship era: 1899-1901 ===
Duquesne Garden on January 19, 1901 The Pittsburgh Athletic Club vs. Queen's University. Queen's won, 1-0, in front of 5,523 at the Garden. This postcard of the event was published in 1909

The league played at the Casino twice a week, on Tuesday and Friday nights. The first "big league" championship (season) game was November 17, 1896 between Duquesne Country & Athletic Club and All-Pittsburgh, won by Duquesne 2–1; however, the league's season was cut short on December 16, when the Casino rink was destroyed by fire. The "Casino" team, Pittsburgh Athletic Club and Western University teams all lost their hockey equipment in the fire. A fire at the Casino in December 1896 destroyed the only ice hockey rink in Pittsburgh and the league dissolved without a championship.

The team and the league were revived by the construction of an artificial ice rink at the Duquesne Garden. The league's second season began on January 24, 1899, when the Garden hosted its first hockey game in a match between the Pittsburgh Athletic Club and Western University of Pennsylvania.

The Pittsburgh Athletic Club would then go on to claim the league’s first championship. The team then won the next two titles, which resulted in being awarded the $500 Trophy, in 1900 and again in 1901

The 1901–02 season is considered the first season in which the league and its teams were recognized as professional. The first professional ice hockey league. To fill the team, the Pittsburgh Athletic Club recruited players from Canada with promises of high-paid employment and small cash incentives of roughly $30 per week. Two of the players signed by the Pittsburgh Athletic Club were George Lamb and Bill Hamilton.

In 1904, the Pittsburgh Athletic Club was captained by Alf Smith, a future Hall of Famer, who won four straight Stanley Cup titles as a player and coach with the Ottawa Silver Seven from 1903 to 1906.

The WPHL and its teams lasted until the end of the 1903–04 season, when the league pulled their best players to field one Pittsburgh team, the Pittsburgh Professionals, to play in the International Professional Hockey League.

In 1904–05, a re-formed PAC team played a handful of exhibition games, including a series against the Dawson City Nuggets. The Pittsburgh Post described this version of the team as made up of "interscholastic players, skate boys from the Garden and has-beens of former years".

=== Revival and quick demise ===
The WPHL, along with the Pittsburgh Athletic Club team was revived for the 1907–08 season. The team now featured several of Canada's top talent, including Albert Kerr, Ken Mallen, Garnet Sixsmith and Cyclone Taylor; however, the WPHL could no longer rely on salaries as novelty to attract Canadian talent, since professionalism had spread into Canada. Later on many of these players and their legacy would help start the NHL. Many players signed up, particularly since the WPHL played on Duquesne Garden's artificial ice and was not dependent on cold weather to provide a naturally frozen surface; however, as winter began and Canadian rinks became available, the players returned north to teams closer to home. This attrition affected all of the league's teams. The Pittsburgh Athletic Club itself saw the mid-season defections of stars like Cyclone Taylor and Con Corbeau to Canada. Finally, after the 1908–09 season the WPHL and the Pittsburgh Athletic Club team disbanded.

== Hall of Famers ==
- Alf Smith (1962)
- Cyclone Taylor (1947)

Preceded by First Championship Awarded	WPHL Champions; 1898-99, 1899–1900, 1900-01	Succeeded by Pittsburgh Keystones; 1901-02
