= Duquesne Country and Athletic Club (ice hockey) =

Duquesne Country & Athletic Club
- City: Pittsburgh, Pennsylvania
- League: Western Pennsylvania Hockey League
- Founded: 1895; 131 years ago
- Operated: 1895–1901
- Home arena: Schenley Park Casino (1895–1896); Duquesne Garden (1898–1901)
- Colors: Red, Black

Championships
- Regular season titles: 0

The Duquesne Country and Athletic Club ice hockey team was a member of the Western Pennsylvania Hockey League (WPHL) from 1896 to 1901. The team was based in Pittsburgh, Pennsylvania.

== History ==
The Duquesne Country and Athletic Club (DC&AC) first played exhibition games of ice hockey in 1895. The Duquesne team then played in the first season of the WPHL at the Schenley Park Casino, with three other teams, the Pittsburgh Athletic Club, a club from Western University of Pennsylvania (the University of Pittsburgh today) and a team known as Pittsburgh, or the 'Casino' team. The league played twice a week, on Tuesday and Friday nights. The DC&AC and the WPHL continued play until December 16, when the Casino rink was destroyed by fire. The Duquesne team finished the shortened season of league play with a 2–3 record.

The league and the DC&AC resumed play in 1898, with its games moved to the new ice rink at the Duquesne Garden, with league members the Pittsburgh Athletic Club and Western University. Many of the team's players came from Canada, with the Pittsburgh-based club owners luring players to the area with the promise of high paying jobs and a living stipend.

By early 1901, the broader DC&AC organization, which had been active in multiple sports and fielded a professional football team of national repute, was in financial ruin and lost its clubhouse to foreclosure. The 1900–01 season was the hockey team's last.

== See also ==
- Duquesne Country and Athletic Club, an early American professional football team
