= Schenley Park Casino =

Former multi-purpose arena in Pittsburgh, Pennsylvania, US (1895–96)

- Schenley Gardens
- Interactive map of Schenley Park Casino
- Location: Pittsburgh, Pennsylvania
- Coordinates: 40°26′30.11″N 79°57′4.50″W
- Owner: The Schenley Park Amusement Company
- Operator: James Conant
- Capacity: 1,200 (Hockey); 3,500 (Theater)
- Surface: Ice, Concrete-Marble Mixture
- Field size: 225' x 70' ice surface

Construction
- Groundbreaking: 1893
- Opened: May 29, 1895
- Demolished: December 17, 1896 (Fire)
- Cost: $400,000 (USD) (Proposed) $540,000 (USD) (Actual)

Tenants
- Pittsburgh Athletic Club (1895–1896); Pittsburgh Casino (1896); Duquesne Country & Athletic Club (1895–1896); Western University (1895–1896); Various Local Teams

The Schenley Park Casino was Pittsburgh’s first multi-purpose arena. The facility was considered the envy of the sports and entertainment world during the early 1890s, with amenities that were unsurpassed anywhere on the globe. It was built at the entrance to Schenley Park in Oakland near the Phipps Conservatory, the Schenley Bridge and the Carnegie Library of Pittsburgh. The University of Pittsburgh’s Frick Fine Arts Building currently sits on the site of the casino. The casino was the first place in Pittsburgh where organized ice hockey was played. The arena's artificial ice surface was the first of its kind in North America.

== Construction and brief use ==
In the fall of 1893, The City of Pittsburgh pondered on the idea of multi-purpose facility that would be a place for theater, recreation and social gathering. The idea sputtered through a committee of capitalists until Casino manager, James Wallace Conant convinced political boss, Christopher Magee, that the new building could feature an indoor ice skating rink. The notion of indoor ice skating galvanized the casino’s construction plan. As a result, investors were quick to agree to the $400,000 financing, and construction of the casino was completed before opening to the public on May 29, 1895.

Interior of the casino, the first hockey team in 1895. This is the earliest known image of ice hockey in Pittsburgh

The casino contained luxury boxes, as well as a grand theater, and a $45,000 roof garden. Each end of the ice rink featured 10 dressing rooms which were furnished with oil paintings and tapestries. The rooms were owned by politicians and capitalists from the banking, steel, coal and railroad industries and were used for winter carnivals, skating expos and political rallies. The facility also contained a ladies’ reception room which was furnished with imported carpeting, lace curtains, and stuffed leather recliners. It also featured a childcare and play area.

However the primary attraction at the casino was the elliptical-shaped, 225 × 70-foot (21 m) ice surface. The facility offered public skating sessions, which were held only on weekdays. The five-cent admission included steel skate frames that were strapped over a person’s winter footwear. In the summer, the casino was used as a 3,500-seat theatre.

=== First hockey game in Pittsburgh ===
On December 30, 1895, the Pittsburgh Press made mention of a “great international hockey and polo tournament” opening game at the casino. The newspaper reported that a team consisting of ten players from Queen's University played against a group of local players from Western University (today the University of Pittsburgh) and Pittsburgh Catholic College of the Holy Ghost (today Duquesne University) and a half-hour of exhibition of hockey was played before the polo match. The paper noted that 2,500 to 3,000 fans showed up to watch the game, despite claims of bad weather. No score or records were reportedly kept but the paper did note that the team from Queen's University outplayed the Pittsburghers, who had never played the game before.

== Destruction ==
On December 17, 1896, at approximately 1:45 am, an ammonia pipe in the icemaking department began leaking. Firefighters believed the gas mixed with grease and created an explosion resulting in a fire that consumed the equipment room in the rear of the casino and spread to the ladies’ dressing room.

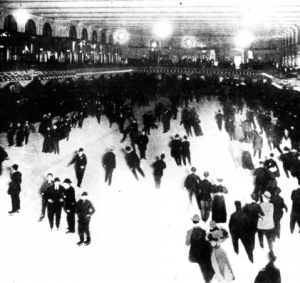
Public skating at the casino

Cold temperatures decreased the water pressure for the fire department's hoses, and limited access across the wooden Schenley Bridge, which was also damaged during the incident, gave the fire too much of a head start for firefighters to have a realistic chance of battling it. The amount of heat from the blaze was strong enough to melt the glass windows of nearby Phipps Conservatory. Dense smoke and heavy poisonous ammonia fumes forced firefighters in their horse-drawn equipment to retreat from trying to save the main hall of the building, resulting in the fire being declared unmanageable by Pittsburgh Fire Chief, Miles Humphries.

== Aftermath ==
At first, many investors were hopeful that the casino could be rebuilt. However, they later learned that the $400,000 building was only insured for a sum of $50,000–$75,000. The Yale University hockey team was to have played a series of games against Duquesne Country and Athletic Club, Western University of Pennsylvania, Pittsburgh Athletic Club and the so-called "Pittsburgh" team the weekend after the fire, but they were telegraphed and told not to come to Pittsburgh. The only thing that remained was the large brick smokestack and a portion of the wall along the bridge side of the casino. Along with the facility, a brand-new merry-go-round, valued at $30,000, was also destroyed in the blaze.

The loss of the casino led many local investors to look into constructing a new multi-purpose arena. Christopher Magee, the city's first elected treasurer, focused local attention on the Duquesne Traction Company, an old streetcar barn less than a half mile away from the casino. The devastating loss of the casino hastened efforts in transforming the barn into the city’s new multi-purpose sports and entertainment venue that became the Duquesne Garden.

== Legacy ==
- The casino is credited as having the first artificial ice surface in North America.
- The casino was the first place in Pittsburgh where organized ice hockey was played.
- At the time, the casino had the most modern indoor lighting system that consisted of 1,500 incandescent lamps, 11 arc lights and 4 white calcium lights.

Preceded by Initial	Pittsburgh Hockey Arenas; 1895–1896	Succeeded by Duquesne Garden
