= Duquesne Gardens =

Arena in Pittsburgh USA (1890–1956)

Coordinates: 40.4480°N 79.9486°W

The Duquesne Gardens
- "The Arena" "The Gardens"
- The Duquesne Gardens in the mid-1950s
- Interactive map of The Duquesne Gardens
- Former names: Duquesne Garden (1898–1940); The Gardens (1940–1956)
- Address: 110 North Craig Street
- Location: Pittsburgh, Pennsylvania
- Capacity: 5,000 (hockey); 5,657 (standing room); 8,000 ("unofficial" capacity)
- Surface: Ice, Wood

Construction
- Groundbreaking: 1886
- Built: 1890 Trolley Barn; 1895 Ice Rink
- Closed: 1956
- Demolished: August 13, 1956
- Cost: $500,000 (USD) ($19.4 million in 2025)

Tenants
- Hockey; Pittsburgh Pirates (NHL) (1925–1930); Pittsburgh Hornets (AHL) (1936–1956); Pittsburgh Shamrocks (IHL) (1935–1936); Pittsburgh Yellow Jackets (IHL) (1930–1932); Pittsburgh Yellow Jackets (EAHL) (1935–1937); Fort Pitt Hornets (USAHA) (1924–1925); Pittsburgh Yellow Jackets (USAHA) (1915–1925); Pittsburgh Professionals (IPHL) (1904–1907); Western Pennsylvania Hockey League; Duquesne Athletic Club (1908–1909); Duquesne Country & Athletic Club (1898–1901); Pittsburgh Athletic Club (1898–1904, 1907–1909); Pittsburgh Bankers (1899–1904, 1907–1909); Pittsburgh Keystones (1900–1904); Pittsburgh Lyceum (1907–1908); Pittsburgh Pirates (1907–1908); Pittsburgh Victorias (1902–1904); WUP Hockey Club (1898–1900); Basketball; Pittsburgh Ironmen (BAA) (1946–1947); Duquesne Dukes Basketball (NCAA) (1914–1956); Pittsburgh Panthers basketball (NCAA) (1905–1912)

The Duquesne Gardens (officially Duquesne Garden until 1940 and The Gardens afterward) (Note: The arena was originally named "Duquesne Garden". It was renamed "The Gardens" in 1940 but has since also been known as "Duquesne Gardens".) was the main sports arena located in Pittsburgh, Pennsylvania, during the first half of the 20th century. Built in 1890, the building originally served as a trolley barn, before becoming a multi-purpose arena. The Gardens opened three years after a fire destroyed the city's prior sports arena, the Schenley Park Casino, in 1896. Over the years, the Gardens was the home arena of several of Pittsburgh's historic sports teams, such as ice hockey's Pittsburgh Pirates and Pittsburgh Hornets. The Western Pennsylvania Hockey League, which was the first ice hockey league to openly hire and trade players, played all of its games at the Gardens. The arena was also the first hockey rink to ever use glass above the dasher boards. Developed locally by the Pittsburgh Plate Glass Company, Herculite glass was first tested in Pittsburgh. Most rinks were using wire mesh before the shatterproof glass was invented. Finally, the Pittsburgh Ironmen, a charter member of the Basketball Association of America (a forerunner of the National Basketball Association), played at the Gardens from 1946 to 1947.

Outside team sports, the Duquesne Garden Ball Room, located on the arena's second floor, was also one of the largest dance halls in the country during the time.

== History ==
=== Beginnings: 1890–1910 ===
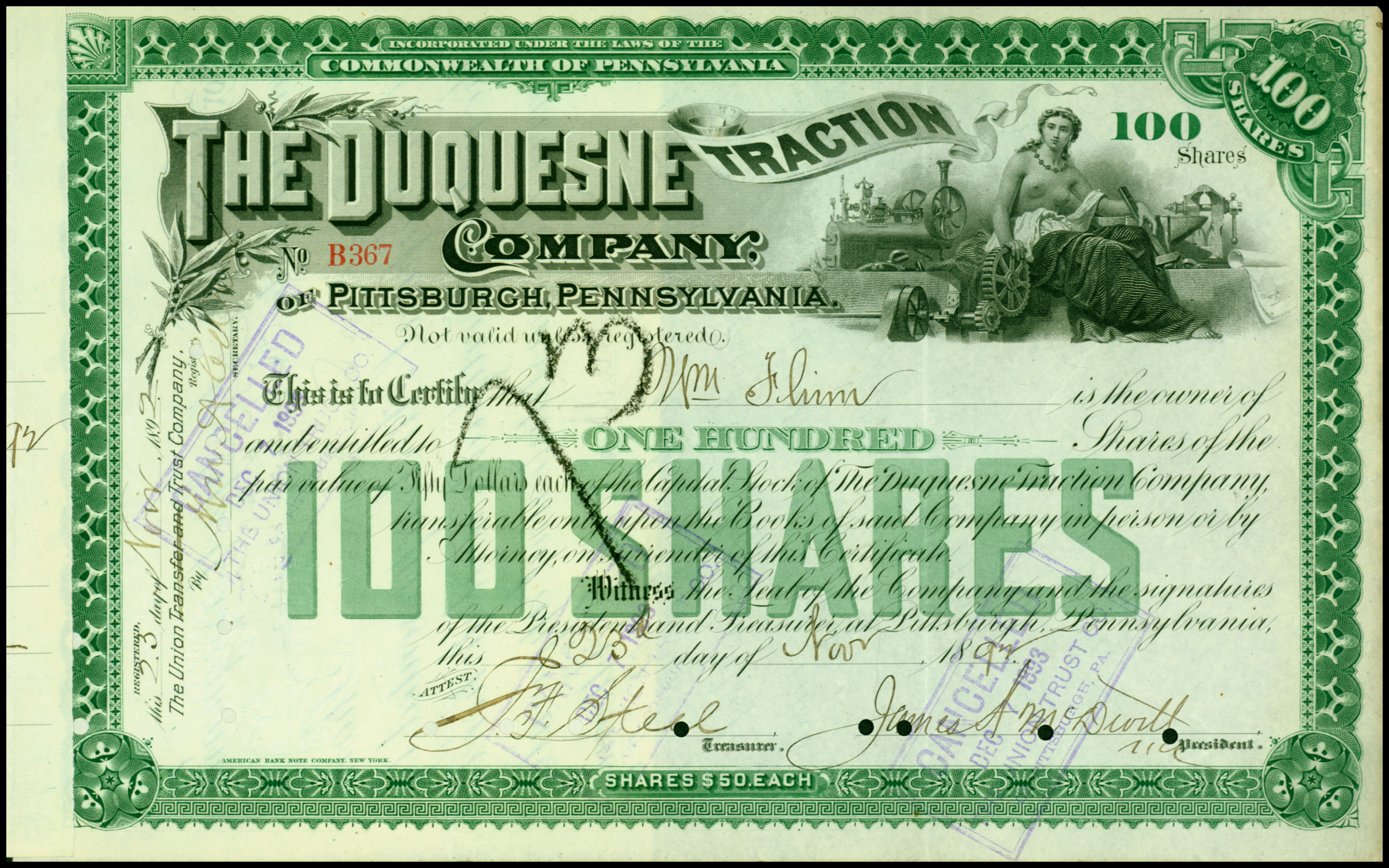
Share of the Duquesne Traction Company, issued 23. November 1892

Duquesne Garden was originally built in 1890 as a trolley barn for the Duquesne Traction Company in the city's Oakland neighborhood. In 1895, Christopher Lyman Magee, a Pittsburgh politician, spent nearly $500,000 ($19.4 million in 2025) to purchase and renovate the building. He named the transformed structure Duquesne Garden, although it was always called the "Arena" by the locals. The Garden, which had the world's largest indoor ice rink and a second-floor ballroom, became a premier indoor venue.

Duquesne Garden on January 19, 1901. The Pittsburgh Athletic Club vs. Queen's University. Queen's won, 1–0, in front of 5,523 at the Garden. This postcard of the event was published in 1909

Speed skating, roller skating, dance contests, musical performances, roller derby, bicycle racing, and college basketball were all hosted at the Garden, as were rodeos and the circus. The Garden also featured Pittsburgh Golden Gloves boxing and housed a movie theater. The Duquesne Garden Ball Room, located on the second floor, has been used by some of the leading clubs and societies in the city for their annual dances. The building quickly became the site for all manner of gatherings: There were opera performances, boxing matches and political rallies.

However, the facility's main attraction was its artificial ice surface, unrivaled in North America. Most other American cities lacked a facility that produced artificial ice at the time. And with 26,000 square feet of ice surface at the Garden, was nearly 50 feet longer than the modern-day rinks in the National Hockey League (NHL) and had state-of-the-art refrigeration and resurfacing technology. On January 24, 1899, the Garden hosted its first ice hockey game in a match between the Pittsburgh Athletic Club and Western University of Pennsylvania (University of Pittsburgh). According to Total Hockey, the official encyclopedia of the NHL, Pittsburgh was one of the first cities in North America to lure amateur Canadian players for what was a standard $30 a week stipend and a local job in the early 1900s. The manager of a Canadian team returned from a trip to the Garden in 1902, according to an account in Total Hockey, and gave the following description to the Toronto Globe: "Pittsburgh is hockey crazy. Over 10,000 turned out for our three games there. The general admission being 35 cents and 75 cents for a box seat . . . the Pittsburgh rink is a dream . . . What a marvellous place it is."

The teams of the Western Pennsylvania Hockey League, and the Pittsburgh Professionals of the International Professional Hockey League, played their games at the Garden up until 1909. The Garden's artificial ice surface helped make Pittsburgh a professional hockey pioneer, much the way the region had given birth to the first professional American football players in the 1890s. Players in the WPHL were paid to play hockey before 1904, but that is when the first professional league officially formed. The Pittsburgh Professionals joined Canadian Soo, Michigan Soo, Calumet Miners, and the Portage Lakes Hockey Club to form the IPHL in 1904. However, after the 1906–07 season, other professional leagues began popping up and the IPHL disbanded, while the WPHL was revived until 1909. During this era, Garnet Sixsmith, who played on several Pittsburgh teams, once scored 11 goals in a game at the Garden. His 11 goals is considered to be a record for the arena.

=== Olympics, Yellow Jackets and Pirates: 1910–1936 ===
From 1910 to 1915, hockey and ice skating at the Garden were replaced by roller skating, which was experiencing a wave of popularity. Hockey was brought back in the winter of 1915–16, when the amateur Duquesne Garden hockey team (which later played under the banner of the Pittsburgh Athletic Association and further evolved into the Pittsburgh Yellow Jackets of the United States Amateur Hockey Association) was founded. The Carnegie Tech hockey club and the University of Pittsburgh hockey team also played their home games at the Garden. Crowds also attended skating sessions at Garden and took part in public skating events. In 1920, public skating was held every evening, except on days for performances, with Saturday morning being set aside for school children who wanted to learn how to skate.

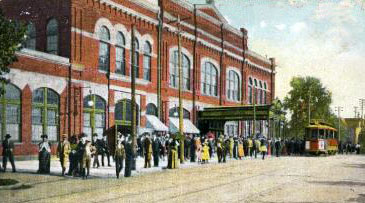
Exterior of the Garden c. 1909

On March 16, 1920, the United States men's national ice hockey team was founded at the Garden. That same year at the Garden, Roy Schooley, the arena's manager, put together an 11-player squad that won silver at the Antwerp Games, in the sport's Olympic debut. The Garden also hosted several contests, which were played on Mondays and Tuesdays, to help raise money in order to cover the expenses associated with sending the U.S. Olympic Hockey team to the games held in Antwerp, Belgium.

By 1924, the Yellow Jackets of the USAHA's Western Division were so dominant that they spun off another Pittsburgh team, the Fort Pitt Hornets, who played in the Eastern Division. In 1925, both Pittsburgh clubs won their respective divisions and played each other for the 1924-1925 USAHA championship at the Garden. The Yellow Jackets won the title in a best of five series, 3 games to none with one tie.

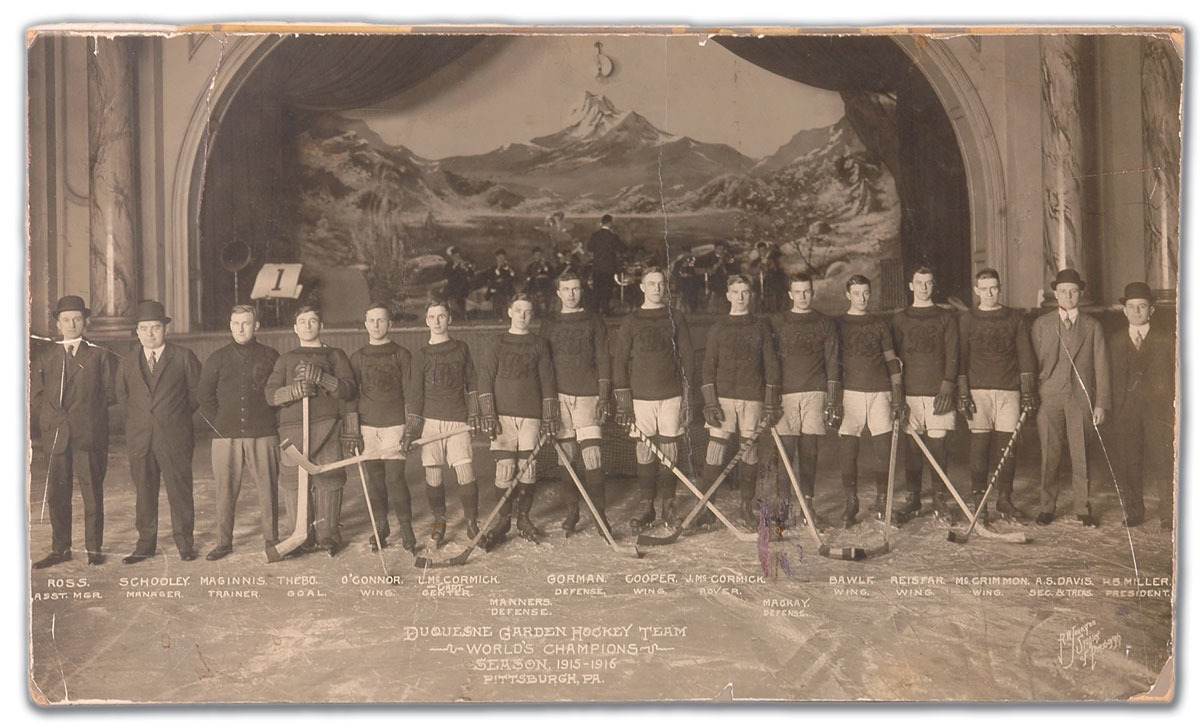
Duquesne Garden hockey team, 1916

In 1925, the expansion Pittsburgh Pirates team of the NHL was assembled by signing players from the Yellow Jackets to professional contracts. The Pirates were admitted to the NHL on November 7, 1925. Around this time, the Garden's massive ice surface was reduced to conform to the NHL's standards. Pittsburgh's first-ever NHL game was played on December 2, 1925, with the Pirates taking on the New York Americans in front of 8,200 fans. The Pirates lost the game in overtime, 2–1. By 1930, financial issues, associated with the Great Depression caused the Pirates to relocate to Philadelphia, before folding. What helped make the city such a hotbed for hockey in the early part of the century, the Duquesne Garden, ultimately helped doom the Pirates. The Garden held slightly more than 5,000 fans, which was fine at the turn of the century but small by comparison in the late 1920s to other arenas sprouting up, such as 18,000-seat Madison Square Garden. The Pirates did not make very much money playing in the 5,000-seat Garden. The team was so strapped for money that they traded former captain Lionel Conacher to the New York Americans during the 1926–27 season for a journeyman player and $2,000. Conacher had been the highest-paid NHL player at $7,500 a year. The Pirates later moved the team across the state to become the Philadelphia Quakers for the franchise's last season in 1930–31.

The Garden still witnessed ice hockey even during these dark financial times. In 1930, Roy Schooley founded a new Yellow Jackets team, which played for two years in the International Hockey League (IHL). Pittsburgh theatre chain owner John H. Harris secured a lease on the Garden in 1932 and by 1935 established a third Yellow Jackets incarnation which he entered in the Eastern Amateur Hockey League. In the 1935–36 season, the Yellow Jackets shared the Garden's ice time with the short-lived Pittsburgh Shamrocks of the IHL.

Harris also scheduled boxing and rodeos at the Garden. One notable rodeo act to come to the Gardens was Roy Rogers and his horse Trigger, who performed there on April 30, 1945.

=== Hornets, Ice Capades and Ironmen: 1936–1955 ===
The Demolition of The Gardens in August 1956

Several other historic events took place at the Garden during Harris' tenure. First, on March 31, 1936, he hired Sonja Henie, a 24-year-old Norwegian figure skater, to perform before a Yellow Jackets' home game. Harris found it difficult to draw a large crowd to hockey games during the Great Depression, so he hired Henie to entertain the audience between periods. The performances were a rousing success, and Harris soon set out to create an ice show to rival the song and dance spectaculars that were popular on Broadway. He developed the Ice Capades, which premiered in September 1940. The skating corps of 150 young women clad in elaborate costumes captivated audiences. Harris's Ice Capades, founded in Pittsburgh with an $85,000 investment, was sold in 1963 for $5.5 million. Harris also used the Gardens for Ice Capades auditions and as the show's training school, since many of the show's performers were from western Pennsylvania.

Then on October 4, 1936, Harris purchased the Detroit Olympics and moved the team to Pittsburgh, where they were renamed the Pittsburgh Hornets, and became a member of the American Hockey League. Some players from the Yellow Jackets and Shamrocks players then joined the Hornets. The Yellow Jackets formally folded, while the Garden would be home for the Hornets for the next 20 seasons. The Hornets played their first game at the Garden on November 8, 1936, a 5–2 win over the Cleveland Barons. The franchise later won Calder Cups in 1951, versus the Providence Reds, and in 1955, versus the Buffalo Bisons. On January 10, 1956, the Gardens hosted the American Hockey League All Star Game for the city of Pittsburgh.

However the Gardens was also the home for Duquesne University Basketball as well as the Pittsburgh Ironmen of the Basketball Association of America, a forerunner to the NBA. The team ended their only season in the BAA in 1946–47 with a record of 15–45. The Ironmen consisted of players like Press Maravich, a future college coach and father to Hall of Famer Pete Maravich, and Moe Becker. The arena also hosted the first of 16 NBA neutral site regular season games played in Pittsburgh.

Another sport played at the arena was tennis. On January 15, 1937, the Garden hosted a championship tennis match between world champions Ellsworth Vines and Fred Perry.

== Concerts ==
The Gardens also featured several notable concert acts throughout its history. On July 4, 1929, Jelly Roll Morton and his jazz band, the Red Hot Peppers, played the Garden. Then in August 1933, the arena hosted Cab Calloway and his orchestra. Segments of Calloway's show there was then broadcast over the radio. The Gardens also hosted, opera singer, Enrico Caruso.

== Demolition and legacy ==
A section of brick wall from the Duquesne Gardens which was reconstructed and placed inside of PPG Paints Arena.

While the Garden earned much praise in its early days, the place was outdated by the 1920s. About 15,000 fans could be comfortably seated in Madison Square Garden, Boston Garden, and Montreal Forum. Not even half that number could squeeze into the Garden. Around this time, the ice-making operation at the Garden was antiquated. In November 1927, the Toronto Star reported that the Pirates had to train at a local gym instead of the Garden, since the Garden's ice machine had broken down. However, while celebrating its 40th anniversary, the Garden still boasted as having one of the highest-regarded ice surfaces in North America, still drawing hockey players from Canada.

The Gardens was demolished in 1956 to make way for an apartment building and a local fixture, Stouffer's Restaurant. Stouffer's, which became Duranti's Restaurant in 1979, featured the only remaining evidence of the Gardens, two 11-foot wide sections of exposed red brick wall, which would have been the back wall of the Gardens' visiting dressing room. Duranti's then closed in December 2008 and the apartment building that replaced the Gardens was to be torn down and renovated. Jim Kubus, the editor of pittsburghhockey.net, a local history site, and his brother removed the bricks before the wall could be destroyed and stored them for the next two years. Today, a Captain Morgan-sponsored lounge, which is located inside Pittsburgh's current multi-purpose arena, the PPG Paints Arena, contains a small section of that particular wall from the Duquesne Gardens. Billy Conn, the famed Pittsburgh boxer who nearly won a match against Joe Louis, fought at the Gardens. On June 18, 1998, the intersection where the Gardens once stood was dedicated as "Billy Conn Blvd."

Demolition of The Gardens brought a temporary end to professional ice hockey in Pittsburgh, as there was no other suitable arena to replace it even for temporary use. The Rochester Americans replaced the Hornets in the AHL. Construction of the Pittsburgh Civic Arena began in 1958, three miles to the west of the Gardens, and the Pirates returned when it opened three years later.

== Notes ==
Preceded by Hershey Sports Arena	AHL All-Star Classic; 1956	Succeeded by Rhode Island Auditorium
Preceded by None	Pittsburgh Pirates (NHL) Arenas; 1925–1930	Succeeded by Philadelphia Arena
Preceded by Detroit Olympia	Pittsburgh Hornets Arenas; 1936–1956	Succeeded by Pittsburgh Civic Arena
