= List of Ottawa Senators (original) players =

This is a list of players who have played at least one game for the Ottawa Hockey Club, best–known as the 'Senators', but also known as the 'Generals' and 'Silver Seven' for the period from 1883 until 1934. In the history of the Club, it was affiliated with the AHAC, Ontario Hockey Association, CAHL, FAHL, ECAHA, NHA and NHL leagues.

This list does not include players who played only for the two successor teams, i.e., the St. Louis Eagles, (the transferred NHL franchise) which played in the 1934–35 season, or the senior amateur Ottawa Senators which started in 1934–35 and continued until 1954.

Single seasons are indicated either with a single year, or a single season designation, e.g., 1916–17. Players marked with ^{'H'} are in the Hockey Hall of Fame.

== A ==
- Jack Adams^{H} (1926–27),
- Bones Allen (1904–05),

== B ==
- Billy Baird (1907),
- Paddy Baskerville (1898),
- Billy Bell (1915–1922),
- Clint Benedict^{H} (1912–1924),
- Bill Beveridge (1930–1934),
- Frank Boucher^{H} (1921–22),
- George "Buck" Boucher^{H} (1916–1929),
- Leo Bourgeault (1930–1933),
- Ralph "Scotty" Bowman (1933–34),
- Reginald Bradley (1890–1894),
- Harry "Punch" Broadbent^{H} (1913–1928),
- Morley Bruce (1917–1922),
- Marty Burke (1932–33),
- Burt Burry (1932–33),
- Ernie Butterworth (1902),

== C ==
- Harry Cameron^{H} (1918–19),
- Earl "Spiff" Campbell (1923–1925),
- Fred Chittick (1894–1901),
- Gene Chouinard (1927–28),
- King Clancy^{H} (1921–1930),
- Sprague Cleghorn^{H} (1918–1921),
- Alec Connell^{H} (1924–1933),
- Harry Connor (1929–1931),
- Bud Cook (1933–34),
- Alex Cope (1897–98),
- Danny Cox (1929–1934),
- Rusty Crawford^{H} (1917–18),
- Alex Currie (1910–11),
- George Currier (1885–1887)

== D ==
- Jack Darragh^{H} (1910–1924),
- Corbett Denneny (1916–17),
- Cy Denneny^{H} (1916–1928),
- Joe Dennison (1911–1913),
- Ted Dey, (1887–1890),
- Edgar Dey (1908–09),
- William Dey (1893,1897),
- Coo Dion (1905–06),
- Angus Duford (1913–1916),
- Jack Duggan (1925–26),
- William Duval (1899–1902),

== E ==
- Jack Ebbs (1905–06)
- Fred Elliott (1928–29)

== F ==
- Dave Finnie (1904–05),
- Frank Finnigan (1923–1934),
- Jack Fournier (1907–08),
- Gus Forslund (1932–33),

== G ==
- Art Gagne (1929–1931),
- Dutch Gainor (1932–33),
- Thomas Gallagher (1884–1885),
- Percy "Perk" Galbraith (1933–34),
- Horace Gaul (1905–1911),
- Greg George (1913–14)
- Eddie Gerard^{H} (1914–1923),
- Billy Gilmour^{H} (1903–1916),
- Dave Gilmour (1897–1903),
- Suddy Gilmour (1902–1904),
- Sammy Godin (1927–1929),
- Edwin Gorman (1924–1927),
- Leth Graham (1914, 1920–1926),
- E. C. Grant (1892–1894)
- Thomas D. Green, (1884–1890),
- Leonard Grosvenor (1927–1931)

== H ==
- Billy Hague (1905–06),
- Milt Halliday (1926–1929),
- Herbert "Bob" Harrison (1907–08),
- Sammy Hebert (1917–1918),
- Harry Helman (1922–1925),
- Harold Henry (1898–1902),
- Lionel Hitchman (1922–1925),
- Flash Hollett (1933–34),
- Syd Howe^{H} (1929–1934),
- S. Howe (1887)
- Howard Hutchison (1896–1898),
- Bill Hutton (1929–30),
- Bouse Hutton (1898–1904),
- Harry Hyland^{H} (1917–18)

== J ==
- Stan Jackson (1926–27),
- Frank Jenkins (1883–1890)

== K ==
- Walter "Jeff" Kalbfleisch (1933–34),
- Max Kaminsky (1933–34),
- Carroll Kendall (1916–17),
- Jack Kerr (1883–1893),
- Dubbie Kerr (1908–1912),
- Hec Kilrea (1925–1933),
- Wally Kilrea (1929–1933),
- Ray Kinsella (1930–31),
- Chauncey Kirby (1892–1899),
- Halder Kirby (1883–1894)

== L ==
- Fred Lake (1909–1915),
- Joe Lamb (1928–1934),
- Albert "Battleship" Leduc (1933–34),
- Percy LeSueur^{H} (1906–1914),
- Alf Living (1896–1898),
- Albert Low (1883–1889),
- Eddie Lowrey (1913–1919),
- Gerry Lowrey (1932–33)

== M ==
- Bert Macdonald (1899),
- Jack Mackell (1919–1921),
- Ken Mallen (1909–10),
- Joe McDougal (1893–1895),
- Sam McDougall (1894–1895),
- Frank McGee^{H} (1902–1906),
- James A. McGee (1900–1904),
- Bert McInenly (1932–1934),
- F. McVeity (1886),
- Gordon Meeking (1915–16),
- Horace Merrill (1913–1920),
- Hib Milks (1932–33),
- Arthur Moore (1902–1908),
- Albert Morel (1890–1894),
- Percy Myles (1885–1887)

== N ==
- Frank Nighbor^{H} (1915–1930),
- Henry Nolan (1899–1900),

== O ==
- Henry O'Connor (1899–1900),
- William O'Dell (1885),

== P ==
- Eric Pettinger (1930–31),
- Tommy Phillips^{H} (1907–08),
- Harvey Pulford^{H} (1893–1908),

== R ==
- Bruce Ridpath (1909–1911),
- Dave Ritchie (1917–18),
- Gordon Roberts^{H} (1909–10),
- Des Roche (1932–1934),
- Earl Roche (1932–1934),
- Harvey Rockburn (1932–33),
- Mac Roger (1898–1901),
- Skene Ronan (1911–1919),
- Harry Rosenthal (1898),
- Art Ross^{H} (1914–1916),
- P. D. Ross (1889–1893),
- Bert Russel (1892–1896)
- Jack Ryan (1906–07)

== S ==
- Teddy Saunders (1933–34),
- Gerry Shannon (1933–34),
- Allan Shields (1927–1934),
- Hamby Shore (1904–1918),
- Percy Sims (1903),
- Arthur Sixsmith (1899–1901),
- Walter Smaill (1910),
- James Smellie (1894–95),
- Alex Smith (1924–1933),
- Alf Smith^{H} (1894–1908),
- Art Smith (1930–31),
- Charles Smith, (1890),
- Daniel "Moxie" Smith, (1896–97)
- Harry Smith (1905–1914),
- Reginald "Hooley" Smith^{H} (1924–1927),
- Tommy Smith (1906),
- Rod Smylie (1923–24),
- Charlie Snelling (1906–07),
- Charles Spittal (1896–1907),
- Harold Starr (1929–1933),
- Hank Staveneau (1915–1917),
- Bruce Stuart^{H} (1898–1900, 1902, 1909–1911),
- Hod Stuart (1898–1900)

== T ==
- Cyclone Taylor^{H} (1907–1909),
- H. Taylor (1895),
- Bill Touhey (1928–1934)

== V ==
- Carl Voss (1933–34)

== W ==
- Marty Walsh^{H} (1907–1912),
- Nick Wasnie (1933–34),
- Don Watters (1893–1895),
- C. Watts (1902),
- Ralph "Cooney" Weiland^{H} (1932–1934),
- Harry "Rat" Westwick^{H} (1894–1908, 1915–16),
- Tommy Westwick (1906–07, 1912–13),
- Fred White (1896, 1899, 1905),
- Jack Williams (1906–07),
- Allan Wilson (1913–14),
- Frank Wood (1903)

== Y ==
- George Young (1884, 1889–1891)
- Weldy Young (1889–1899)

== See also ==
- List of NHL players
