= List of Ottawa Senators players =

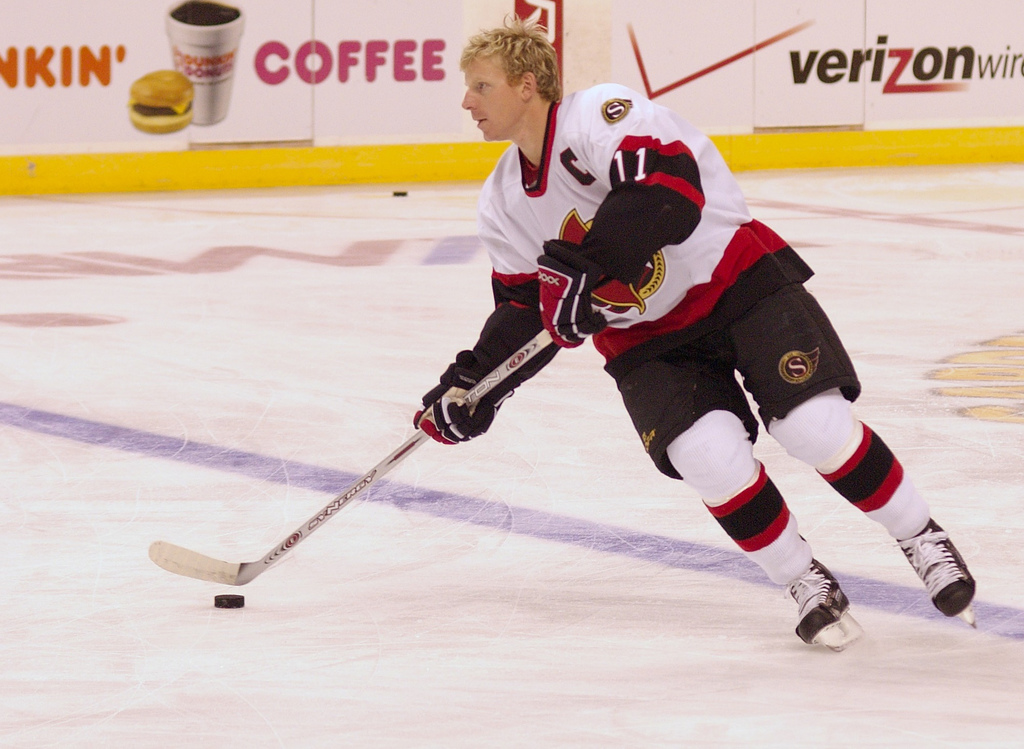
Daniel Alfredsson, the longest-tenured captain in Senators history

The Ottawa Senators are a professional ice hockey team based in Ottawa, Ontario, Canada. They are members of the Atlantic Division in the Eastern Conference of the National Hockey League (NHL). The franchise joined the NHL in 1992 as an expansion team, reviving the name of the original Ottawa Senators, one of the league's founding franchises that competed from 1917 to 1934. Since entering the league, the Senators have qualified for the Stanley Cup playoffs on numerous occasions, winning one President's Trophy as the NHL's top regular-season team and capturing the Eastern Conference championship in 2007, when they made their first appearance in the Stanley Cup Final.

As of the conclusion of the 2025–26 season, a total of 475 players have suited up for the Senators: 50 goaltenders and 425 skaters. Over more than three decades of play, the franchise has been represented by numerous notable players, including Hall of Famers, major award winners, and several of the most prominent players in modern Canadian hockey.

Only four players in franchise history have won major individual NHL awards while members of the Senators. Daniel Alfredsson won the Calder Memorial Trophy as the league's rookie of the year in 1996, the King Clancy Memorial Trophy in 2012, and the Mark Messier Leadership Award in 2013. Bobby Ryan received the Bill Masterton Trophy in 2020 for perseverance, sportsmanship, and dedication to hockey, while Craig Anderson earned the same honour in 2017. Defenceman Erik Karlsson captured the James Norris Memorial Trophy as the NHL's top defenceman in both 2012 and 2015, becoming the first Senator to win the award and one of the most decorated players in franchise history.

Alfredsson served as team captain from 1999 to 2013, making him the longest-serving captain in franchise history. Widely regarded as the greatest player in the history of the modern Senators franchise, he remains the club's all-time leader in regular-season and playoff goals, assists, and points. He also holds the franchise record for most playoff games played. Defenceman Chris Phillips is the franchise leader in regular-season games played with 1,179 appearances, narrowly surpassing Alfredsson's total of 1,178 games. Chris Neil, renowned for his physical style of play and longevity with the organization, holds the franchise record for penalty minutes, accumulating 2,522 in the regular season and an additional 204 in the playoffs over the course of his 15-season NHL career.

In goal, Patrick Lalime and Craig Anderson dominate the Senators' record books. Lalime holds franchise records for regular-season and playoff shutouts and also leads all Ottawa goaltenders in playoff appearances. Anderson, who spent ten seasons with the organization, holds team records for regular-season appearances and victories by a goaltender. The two netminders are tied for the most playoff wins in franchise history, each playing a significant role during some of the club's most successful postseason runs.

== Key ==
* Current member of the Senators organization (including affiliates and reserve list)
† Stanley Cup winner, retired jersey or elected to the Hockey Hall of Fame

Abbreviations
#	Number worn for majority of tenure with Senators
GP	Games Played

Goaltenders
W	Wins	SO	Shutouts
L	Losses	GAA	Goals against average
T	Ties	OTL	Overtime Losses
SV%	Save percentage		

Skaters
Pos	Position	RW	Right Wing	A	Assists
D	Defenceman	C	Centre	P	Points
LW	Left Wing	G	Goals	PIM	Penalty minutes

The seasons column lists the first year of the season of the player's first game and the last year of the season of the player's last game. For example, a player who played one game in the 2000–01 season would be listed as playing with the team from 2000–01, regardless of what calendar year the game occurred within.

Statistics are complete to the end of the 2025–26 NHL season.

== Goaltenders ==
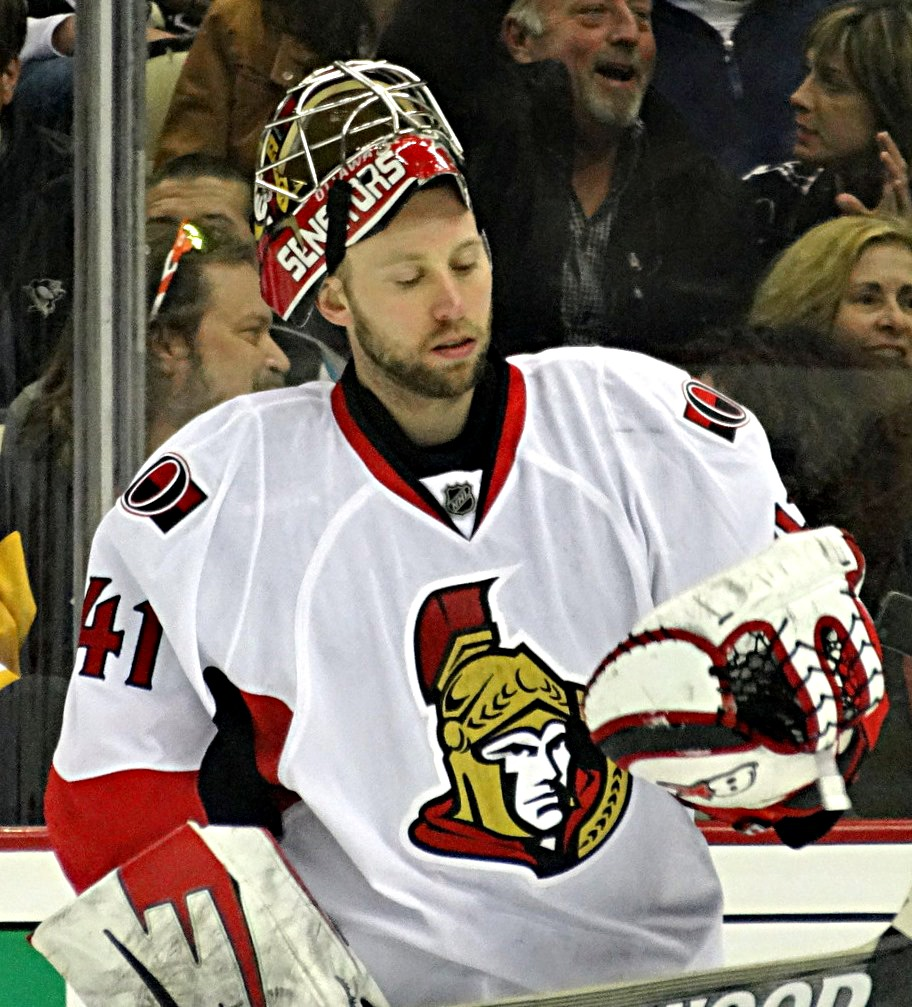
Craig Anderson is the club's all-time leader in regular season games played and wins as a goaltender. In 2017, he became the franchise's first player to win the Bill Masterton Trophy for best exemplifying the qualities of perseverance, sportsmanship, and dedication to the sport.

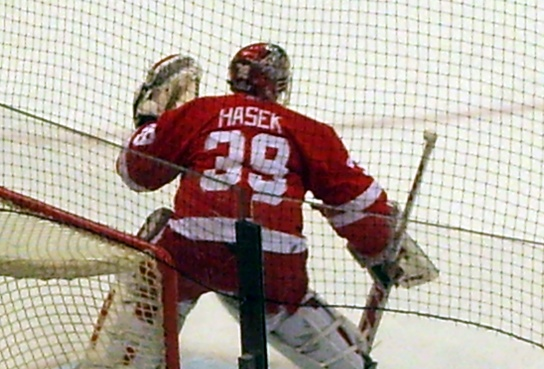
Dominik Hasek, signed in 2004 during the lockout to replace Patrick Lalime and departed as a free agent in July 2006. In 2014, he became the first modern Senators alumnus to be inducted into the Hockey Hall of Fame.

Name	#	Nationality	Seasons	Regular Season								Playoffs						Notes
Name	#	Nationality	Seasons	GP	W	L	T	OTL	SO	GAA	SV%	GP	W	L	SO	GAA	SV%	Notes
Anderson, Craig	41	United States	2010–2020	435	202	168	0	46	28	2.84	.914	40	21	18	3	2.30	.928	Bill Masterton Trophy 2017
Auld, Alex	35	Canada	2008–2009; 2011–2012	57	18	22	0	9	1	2.66	.906	0	0	0	0	0.00	.000	
Bales, Mike	35	Canada	1994–1997	22	2	15	1	0	0	4.16	.869	0	0	0	0	0.00	.000	
Barrasso, Tom†	30	United States	1999–2000	7	3	4	0	0	0	3.16	.879	6	2	4	0	2.58	.905	Hockey Hall of Fame 2023
Beaupre, Don	33	Canada	1994–1996	71	14	48	3	0	2	3.53	.888	0	0	0	0	0.00	.000	
Berthiaume, Daniel	32	Canada	1992–1994	26	2	17	1	0	0	4.39	.871	0	0	0	0	0.00	.000	
Billington, Craig	1	Canada	1993–1995	72	11	47	6	0	0	4.52	.860	0	0	0	0	0.00	.000	
Bishop, Ben	30	United States	2011–2013	23	11	8	0	2	1	2.47	.917	0	0	0	0	0.00	.000	
Brodeur, Mike	31	Canada	2009–2011	7	3	1	0	0	1	2.17	.922	0	0	0	0	0.00	.000	
Condon, Mike	1	United States	2016–2019	73	24	33	0	11	5	2.88	.906	2	0	0	0	3.93	.875	
Daccord, Joey	34	United States	2018–2021	9	1	4	0	1	0	3.50	.894	0	0	0	0	0.00	.000	
Driedger, Chris	32	Canada	2014–2018	3	0	1	0	0	0	2.53	.889	0	0	0	0	0.00	.000	
Elliott, Brian	30	Canada	2007–2011	130	59	45	0	15	9	2.81	.902	4	1	2	0	4.14	.853	
Emery, Ray	1	Canada	2002–2008	134	71	40	0	14	8	2.71	.910	30	18	12	3	2.46	.904	
Ersson, Samuel*	30	Sweden	2026–present	0	0	0	0	0	0	0.00	.000	0	0	0	0	0.00	.000	
Ferguson, Dylan	34	Canada	2022–2023	2	1	1	0	0	0	2.52	.940	0	0	0	0	0.00	.000	
Forsberg, Anton	31	Sweden	2020–2025	142	62	56	0	10	8	2.98	.905	0	0	0	0	0.00	.000	
Fountain, Mike	30	Canada	1999–2001	1	0	1	0	0	0	3.20	.886	0	0	0	0	0.00	.000	
Gerber, Martin	29	Switzerland	2006–2009	100	49	36	0	1	4	2.76	.905	4	0	4	0	3.52	.912	
Gustavsson, Filip	32	Sweden	2020–2022	28	10	13	0	3	0	3.55	.905	0	0	0	0	0.00	.000	
Hammond, Andrew	30	Canada	2013–2018	55	27	14	0	6	4	2.31	.923	2	0	2	0	3.44	.914	
Hasek, Dominik†	39	Czech Republic	2005–2006	43	28	10	0	4	5	2.09	.925	0	0	0	0	0.00	.000	Hockey Hall of Fame 2014
Hellberg, Magnus	39	Sweden	2022–2023	1	1	0	0	0	0	2.00	.935	0	0	0	0	0.00	.000	
Hogberg, Marcus	35	Sweden	2018–2021	42	9	17	0	9	0	3.39	.894	0	0	0	0	0.00	.000	
Hurme, Jani	35	Finland	1999–2002	48	25	14	5	0	5	2.48	.905	0	0	0	0	0.00	.000	
Johansson, Jonas*	31	Sweden	2026–present	0	0	0	0	0	0	0.00	.000	0	0	0	0	0.00	.000	
Korpisalo, Joonas	70	Finland	2023–2024	55	21	26	0	4	0	3.27	.890	0	0	0	0	0.00	.000	
Laforest, Mark	35	Canada	1993–1994	5	0	2	0	0	0	5.60	.823	0	0	0	0	0.00	.000	
Lajeunesse, Simon	35	Canada	2001–2002	1	0	0	0	0	0	0.00	1.000	0	0	0	0	0.00	.000	
Lalime, Patrick	40	Canada	1999–2004	283	146	100	30	0	30	2.32	.913	41	21	20	5	1.77	.926	
Lawson, Nathan	29	Canada	2013–2014	1	0	0	0	0	0	10.00	.800	0	0	0	0	0.00	.000	
Leclaire, Pascal	33	Canada	2007–2011	48	16	21	0	3	0	3.09	.894	3	1	2	0	2.85	.920	
Lehner, Robin	40	Sweden	2010–2015	86	30	36	0	13	2	2.88	.914	2	0	1	0	2.43	.920	
Madeley, Darrin	30	Canada	1992–1995	39	4	23	5	0	0	4.36	.823	0	0	0	0	0.00	.000	
Mandolese, Kevin	70	Canada	2022–2023	3	1	2	0	0	0	3.29	.916	0	0	0	0	0.00	.000	
McElhinney, Curtis	31	Canada	2010–2011	7	3	4	0	0	0	2.56	.917	0	0	0	0	0.00	.000	
McKenna, Mike	33	United States	2018–2019	10	1	4	0	1	0	3.96	.897	0	0	0	0	0.00	.000	
Merilainen, Leevi	35	Finland	2022–2026	34	16	14	0	3	3	3.00	.885	0	0	0	0	0.00	.000	
Morrison, Mike	30	United States	2005–2006	4	1	0	0	1	0	3.47	.875	0	0	0	0	0.00	.000	
Murray, Matt	30	Canada	2020–2022	47	15	25	0	3	3	3.23	.899	0	0	0	0	0.00	.000	
Nilsson, Anders	31	Sweden	2018–2020	44	20	20	0	2	2	3.03	.911	0	0	0	0	0.00	.000	
O'Connor, Matt	29	Canada	2015–2016	1	0	1	0	0	0	3.10	.912	0	0	0	0	0.00	.000	
Prusek, Martin	31	Czech Republic	2001–2004	48	28	9	4	0	3	2.23	.913	1	0	0	0	1.50	.933	
Reimer, James	47	Canada	2025–2026	14	7	4	0	2	1	2.42	.886	0	0	0	0	0.00	.000	
Rhodes, Damian	1	United States	1995–1999	181	65	74	30	0	12	2.56	.902	12	5	7	0	2.19	.918	
Sidorkiewicz, Peter	31	Poland	1992–1993	64	8	46	3	0	0	4.43	.856	0	0	0	0	0.00	.000	
Sogaard, Mads	40	Denmark	2021–2026	31	12	11	0	3	0	3.60	.877	0	0	0	0	0.00	.000	
Talbot, Cam	33	Canada	2022–2023	36	17	14	0	2	1	2.93	.898	0	0	0	0	0.00	.000	
Taylor, Danny	70	Canada	2017–2018	1	0	1	0	0	0	4.14	.882	0	0	0	0	0.00	.000	
Tugnutt, Ron	31	Canada	1996–2000	166	72	51	25	0	12	2.32	.906	11	3	7	1	3.00	.900	
Ullmark, Linus*	35	Sweden	2024–present	93	53	26	0	11	7	2.73	.900	10	2	8	1	2.51	.905	
Weeks, Steve	1	Canada	1992–1993	7	0	5	0	0	0	7.23	.792	0	0	0	0	0.00	.000	

== Skaters ==
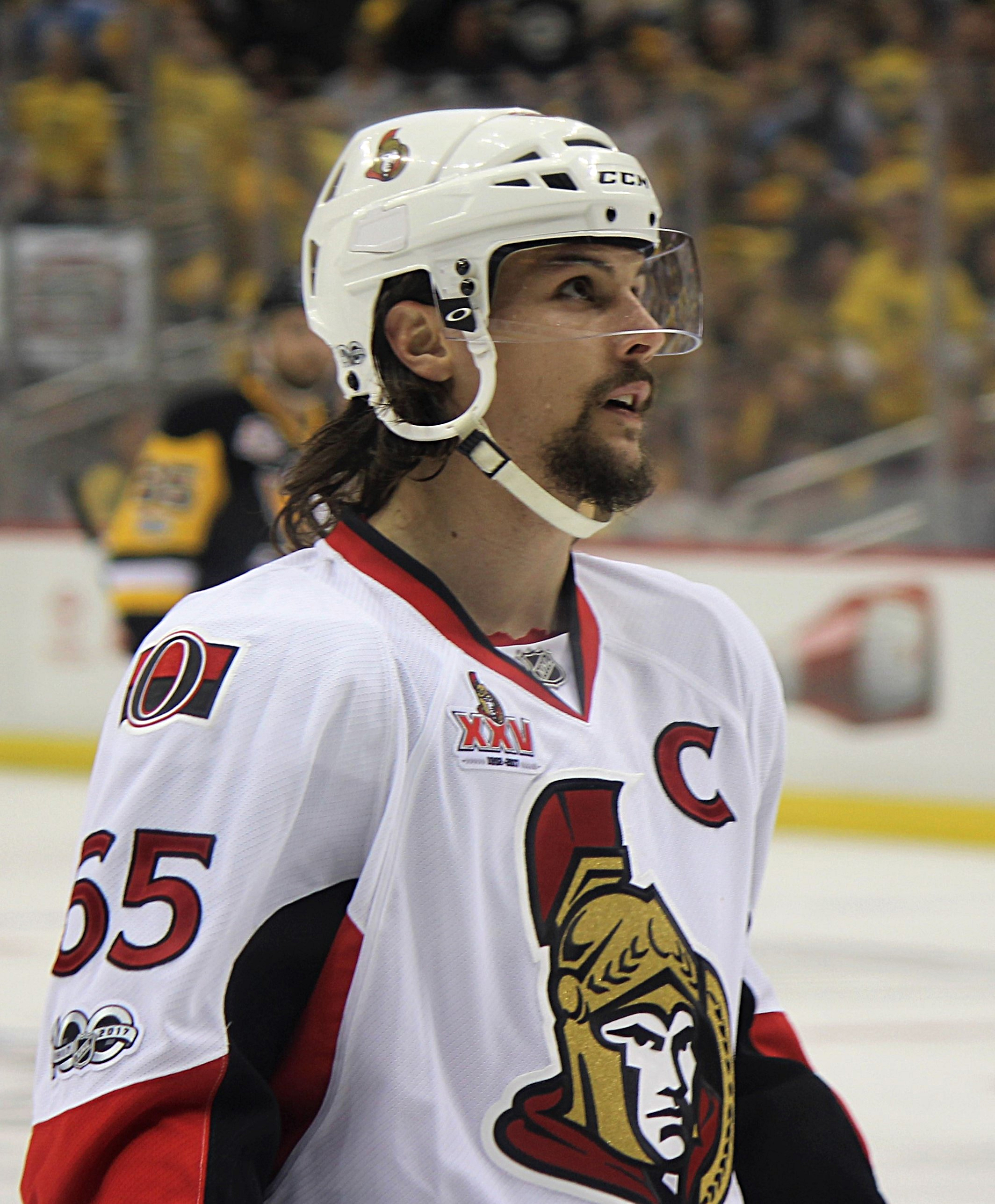
Erik Karlsson was the captain of the Senators from 2014 to 2018. He was selected 15th overall in the 2008 NHL entry draft and won the Norris Trophy in 2012 and 2015. He is the Senators' all-time leader in points by a defenceman.

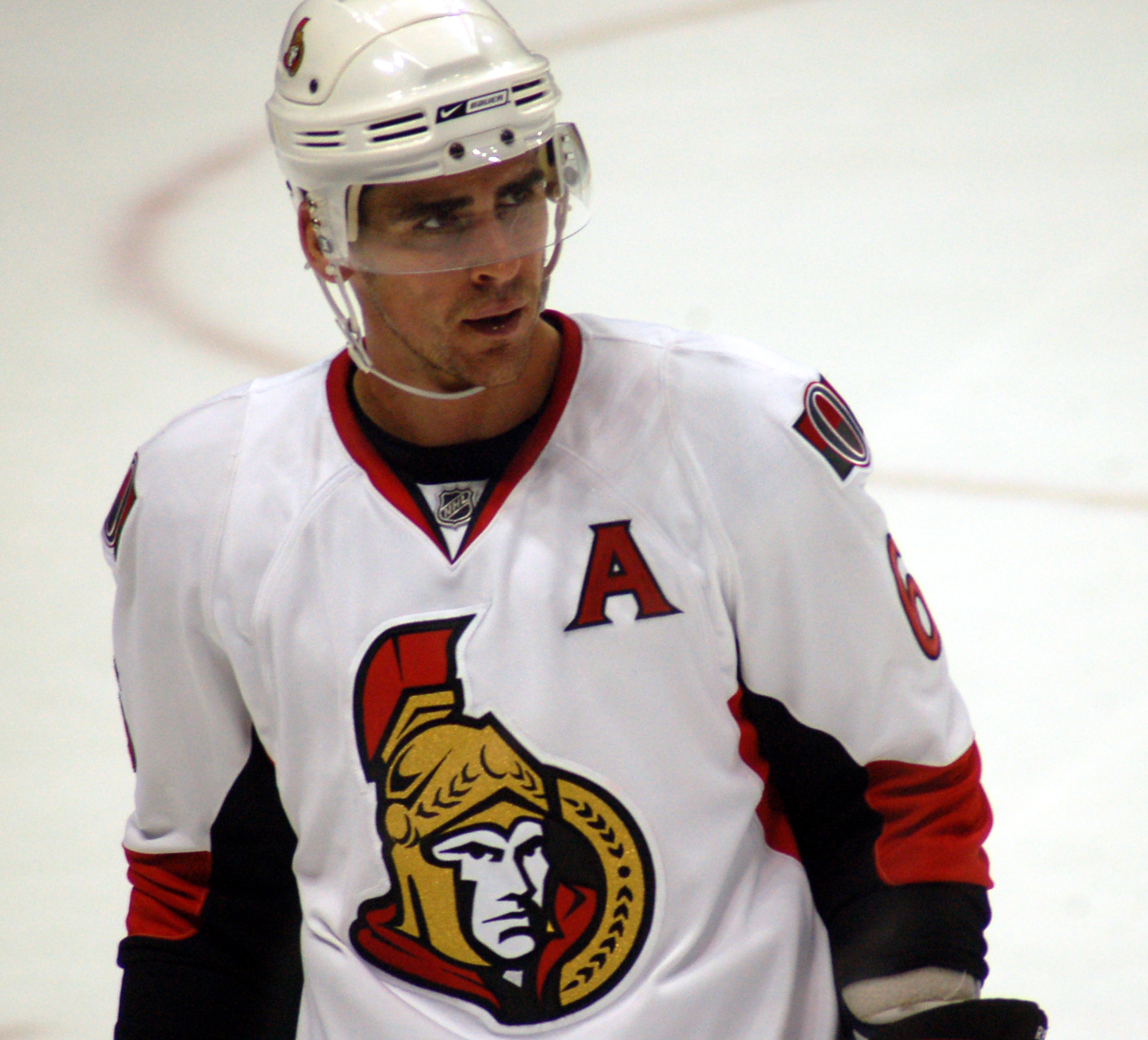
Wade Redden had been a Senator since 1996, but left Ottawa to join the New York Rangers in July 2008. He has previously served as an alternate captain.

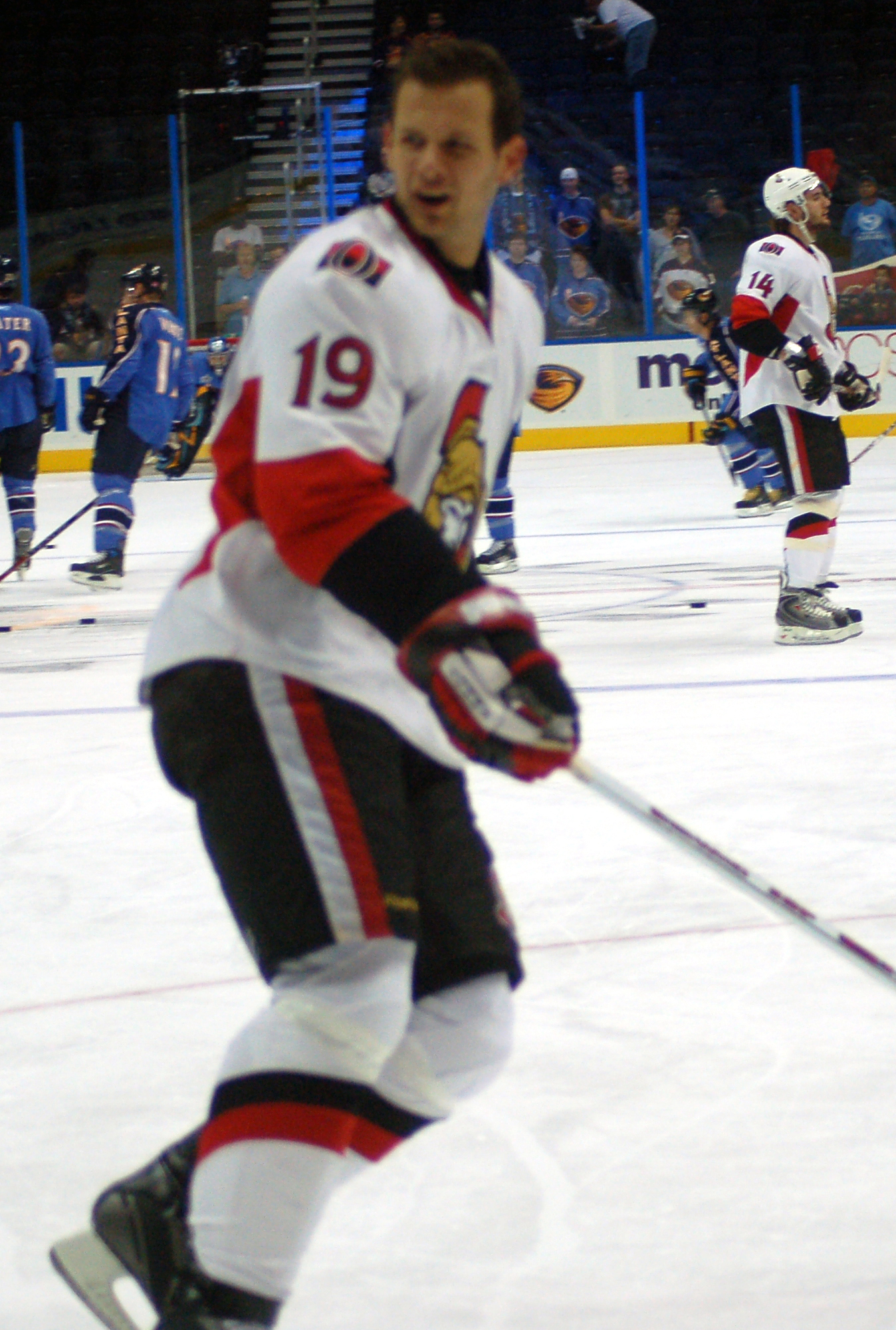
Jason Spezza recorded a career high 71 assists in 2005–06 and was with the club from 2002 to 2014.

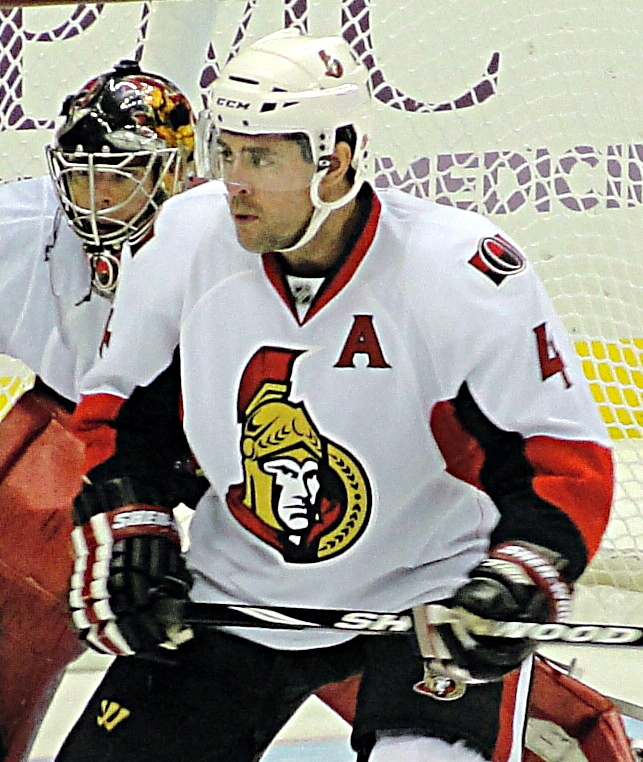
Chris Phillips is the Senators' all-time leader in games played with 1,179. He and Chris Neil are the only players in the modern era to have played their entire career with the Senators.

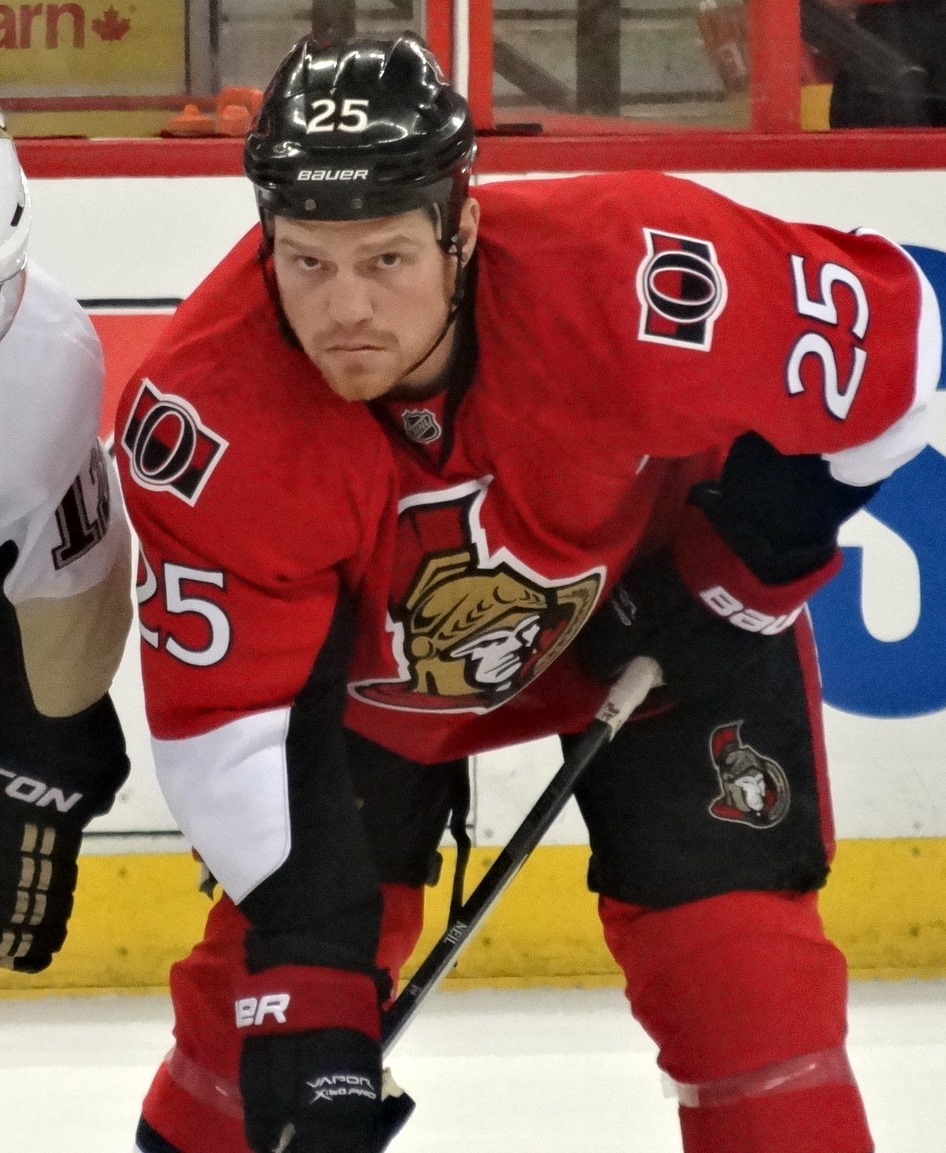
Chris Neil is the Senators' all-time leader in penalty minutes with 2,522. In 2023, he became the third player in franchise history to have his jersey number (#25) retired.

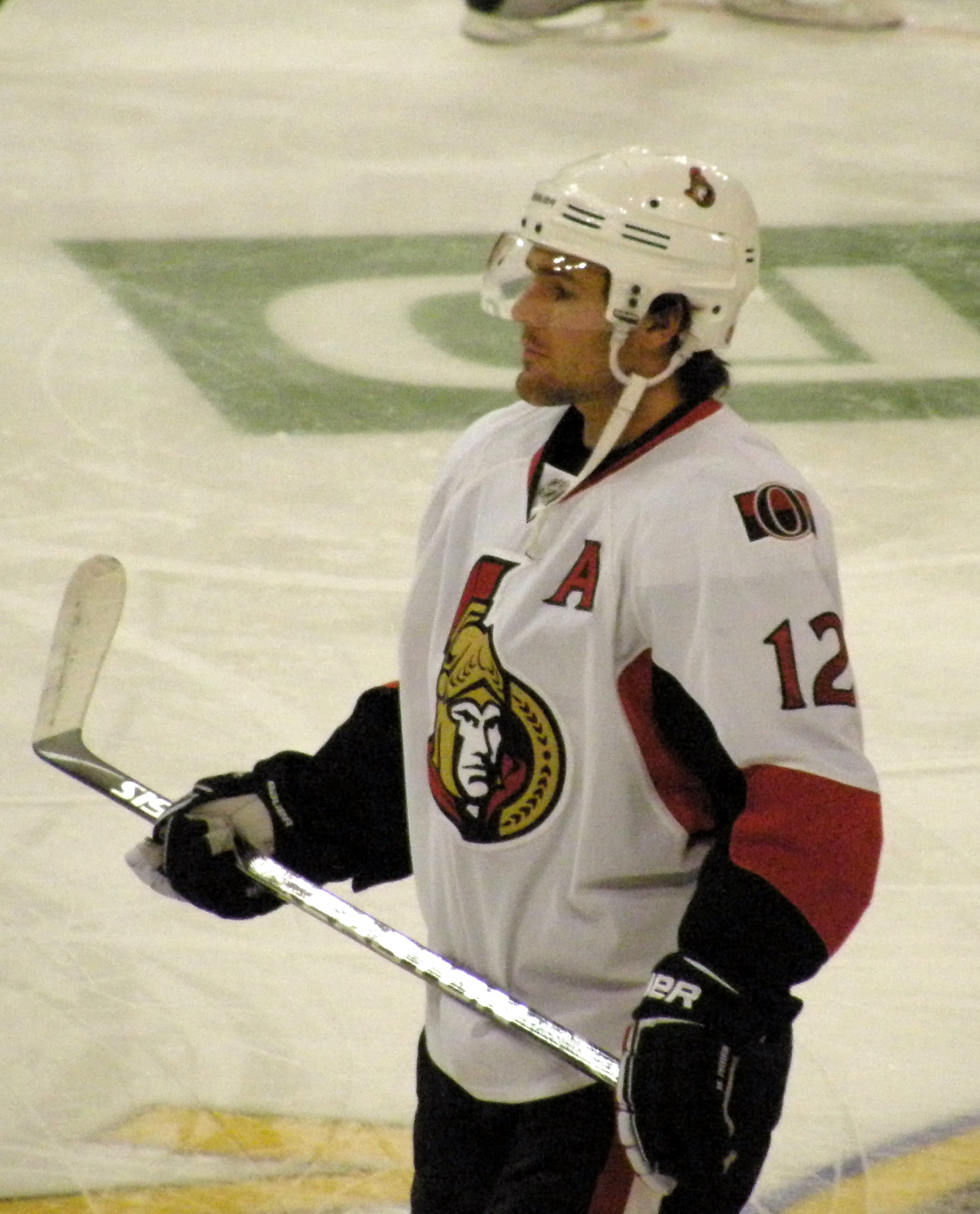
Mike Fisher spent 11 seasons with the Senators before being traded to the Nashville Predators during the 2010–11 season just before the trade deadline.

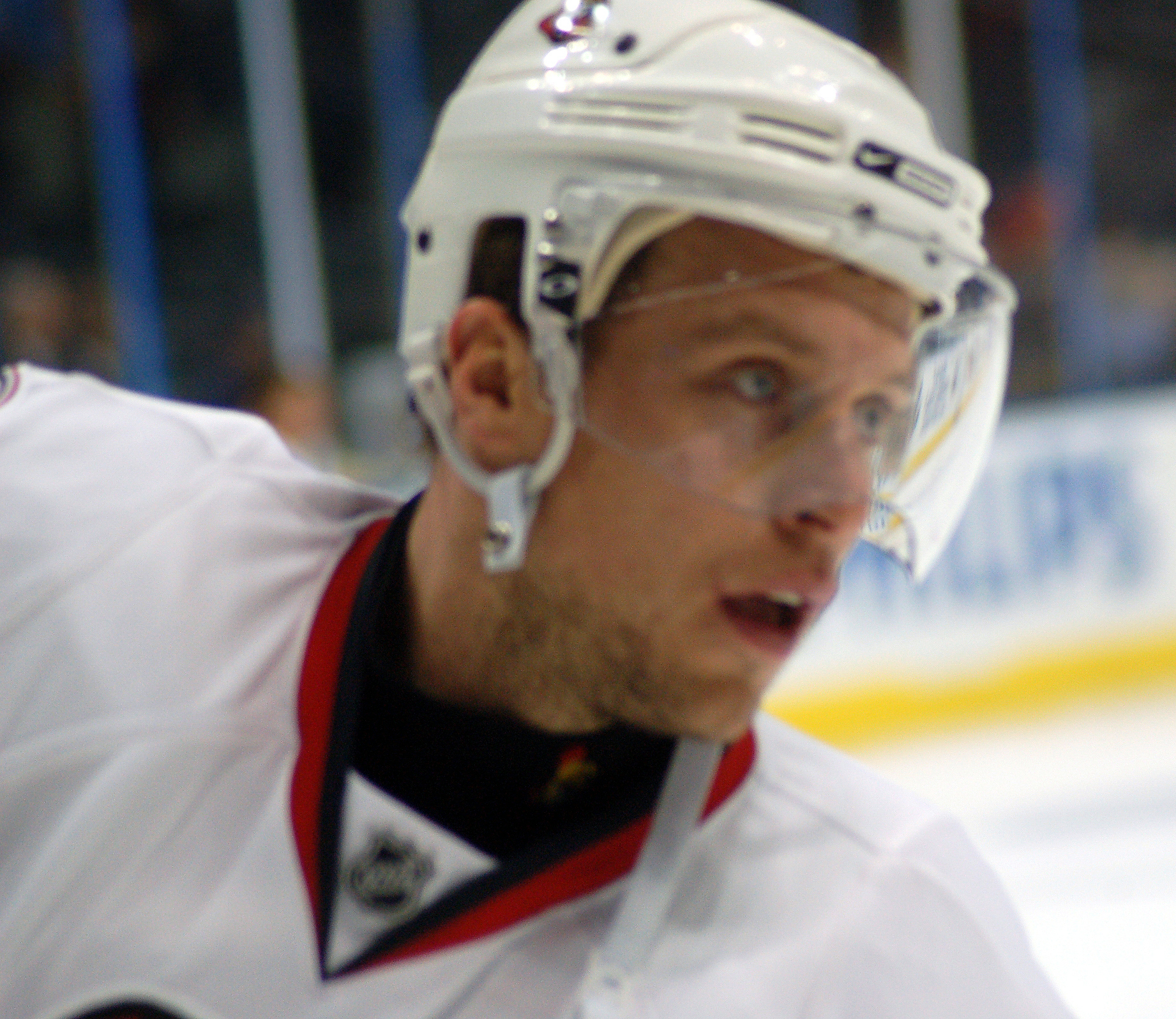
Dany Heatley, traded for Marian Hossa, scored 50 goals in 2005–06 and 2006–07 before leaving the Senators via trade with the San Jose Sharks.

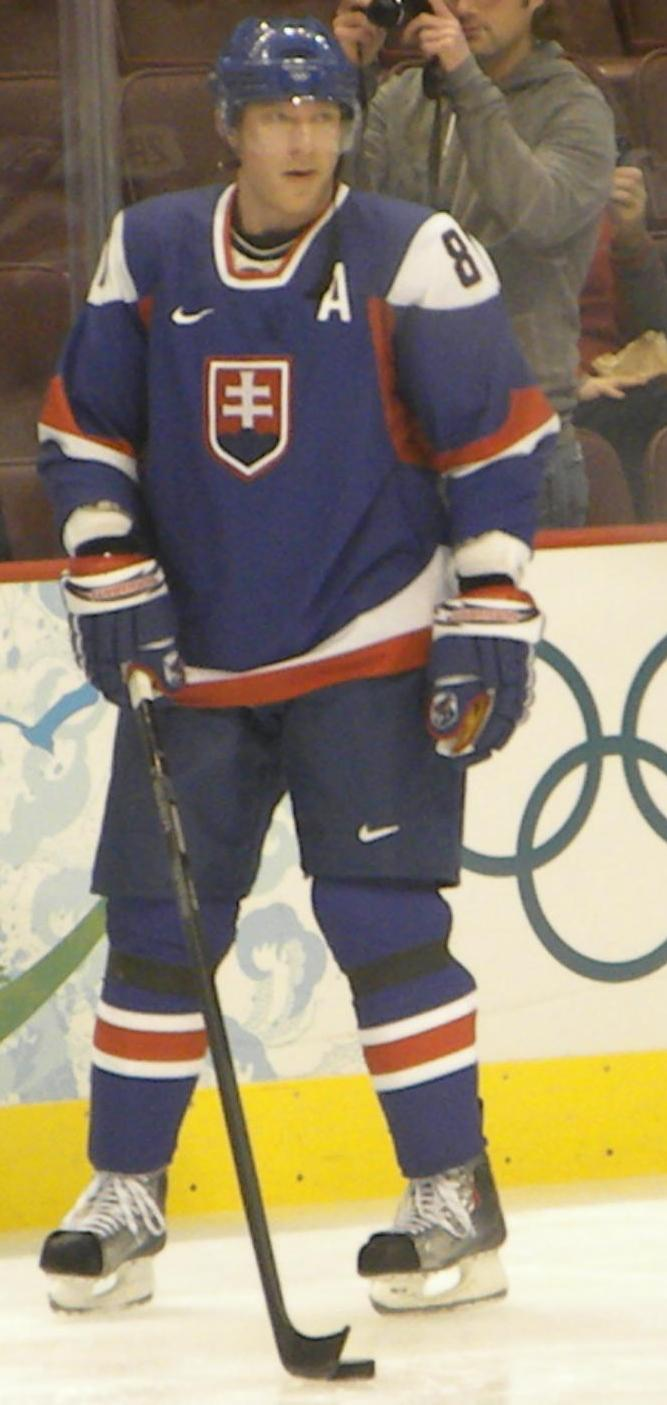
Marian Hossa set a Senators' record of goals in a year with 45 before Dany Heatley's 50 goal years.

Name	#	Nationality	Pos	Seasons	Regular Season					Playoffs					Notes
Name	#	Nationality	Pos	Seasons	GP	G	A	P	PIM	GP	G	A	P	PIM	Notes
Abramov, Vitaly	85	Russia	RW	2018–2021	5	1	0	1	2	0	0	0	0	0	
Agozzino, Andrew	23	Canada	LW	2021–2022	1	0	0	0	0	0	0	0	0	0	
Alfredsson, Daniel†	11	Sweden	RW	1995–2013	1,178	426	682	1,108	500	121	51	49	100	74	Calder Trophy 1996; King Clancy Trophy 2012; Mark Messier Leadership Award 2013 #11 Retired 2016; Hockey Hall of Fame 2022; Captain 1999–2013
Alsing, Olle	52	Sweden	D	2020–2021	4	0	0	0	0	0	0	0	0	0	
Amadio, Michael*	22	Canada	C	2020–2021; 2024–present	158	26	37	63	38	10	0	1	1	4	
Anisimov, Artem	51	Russia	C	2019–2021	68	17	12	29	10	0	0	0	0	0	
Archibald, Darren	90	Canada	LW	2018–2019	3	0	0	0	0	0	0	0	0	0	
Archibald, Dave	15	Canada	RW	1992–1996	135	27	20	47	83	0	0	0	0	0	
Armstrong, Derek	42	Canada	RW	1997–1998	9	2	0	2	9	0	0	0	0	0	
Arnason, Tyler	10	United States	C	2005–2006	19	0	4	4	4	0	0	0	0	0	
Arvedson, Magnus	20	Sweden	LW	1997–2003	393	92	119	201	227	52	3	8	11	34	
Atcheynum, Blair	27	Canada	RW	1992–1993	4	0	1	1	0	0	0	0	0	0	
Bailey, Casey	37	United States	C	2016–2017	7	0	0	0	0	0	0	0	0	0	
Baker, Jamie	13	Canada	C	1992–1993	76	19	29	48	54	0	0	0	0	0	
Bala, Chris	52	United States	LW	2001–2002	6	0	1	1	0	0	0	0	0	0	
Balcers, Rudolfs	38	Latvia	LW	2018–2020	51	6	11	17	10	0	0	0	0	0	
Bass, Cody	58	Canada	C	2007–2011	34	2	2	4	34	4	1	0	1	6	
Batherson, Drake*	19	Canada	RW	2018–present	470	149	215	364	197	10	4	2	6	14	
Beaudin, J.C.	64	Canada	C	2019–2020	22	0	1	1	7	0	0	0	0	0	
Bell, Brendan	9	Canada	D	2008–2009	53	6	15	21	24	0	0	0	0	0	
Benoit, Andre	61	Canada	D	2010–2013	41	3	8	11	14	5	0	3	3	0	
Berg, Bill	9	Canada	D	1998–1999	44	2	2	4	28	2	0	0	0	0	
Bernard-Docker, Jacob	24	Canada	D	2020–2025	129	5	15	20	44	0	0	0	0	0	
Bicanek, Radim	23	Czech Republic	D	1994–1999	35	0	1	1	12	7	0	0	0	8	
Bishop, Clark	62	Canada	C	2020–2022	22	0	4	4	10	0	0	0	0	0	
Blais, Samuel*	79	Canada	LW	2026–present	0	0	0	0	0	0	0	0	0	0	
Blunden, Mike	14	Canada	RW	2016–2018	3	0	0	0	4	0	0	0	0	0	
Bochenski, Brandon	10	United States	RW	2005–2006	20	6	7	13	14	0	0	0	0	0	
Boedker, Mikkel	89	Denmark	RW	2018–2020	91	9	30	39	6	0	0	0	0	0	
Bois, Danny	49	Canada	RW	2006–2007	1	0	0	0	7	0	0	0	0	0	
Boivin, Claude	23	Canada	LW	1993–1994	18	1	1	2	44	0	0	0	0	0	
Bondra, Peter	10	Slovakia	RW	2003–2004	23	5	9	14	16	7	0	0	0	6	
Bonk, Radek	14	Czech Republic	C	1994–2004	709	152	248	400	409	28	9	15	24	38	
Bonvie, Dennis	26	Canada	RW	2002–2003	12	0	0	0	29	0	0	0	0	0	
Borowiecki, Mark	74	Canada	D	2011–2020	375	15	36	51	647	8	0	0	0	8	
Boschman, Laurie	16	Canada	LW	1992–1993	70	9	7	16	101	0	0	0	0	0	Captain 1992–1993
Bourgault, Xavier*	53	Canada	C	2025–present	2	0	0	0	0	0	0	0	0	0	
Bourque, Phil	29	United States	LW	1993–1996	62	7	7	4	34	0	0	0	0	0	
Brady, Neil	12	Canada	C	1992–1993	55	7	17	24	57	0	0	0	0	0	
Brannstrom, Erik	26	Sweden	D	2018–2024	265	7	61	68	145	0	0	0	0	0	
Brassard, Derick	19	Canada	C	2016–2018; 2022–2023	201	45	55	100	84	19	4	7	11	8	
Brown, Connor	28	Canada	RW	2019–2022	191	47	70	117	46	0	0	0	0	0	
Brown, Josh	3	Canada	D	2020–2022	72	0	7	7	62	0	0	0	0	0	
Brown, Logan	21	United States	C	2017–2021	30	1	8	9	6	0	0	0	0	0	
Brown, Patrick	38	United States	C	2022–2023	18	2	3	5	27	0	0	0	0	0	
Brunet, Benoit	26	Canada	LW	2001–2002	13	5	3	8	0	12	0	3	3	0	
Burakovsky, André*	95	Sweden	LW	2026–present	0	0	0	0	0	0	0	0	0	0	
Burakovsky, Robert	24	Sweden	RW	1993–1994	23	2	3	5	6	0	0	0	0	0	
Burgdoerfer, Erik	46	United States	D	2017–2019	6	0	1	1	2	0	0	0	0	0	
Burrows, Alexandre	14	Canada	LW	2016–2018	91	12	13	25	68	15	0	5	5	18	
Butler, Bobby	16	United States	RW	2009–2012	94	16	21	37	22	3	0	0	0	0	
Butsayev, Vyacheslav	25	Russia	C	1998–2000	5	0	1	1	2	0	0	0	0	0	
Campoli, Chris	14	Canada	D	2008–2011	150	12	33	45	62	6	0	2	2	4	
Carey, Paul	28	United States	C	2018–2019	5	0	0	0	0	0	0	0	0	0	
Carkner, Matt	39	Canada	D	2008–2012	161	4	17	21	359	10	1	1	2	33	
Ceci, Cody	5	Canada	D	2013–2019	440	32	86	118	88	25	0	3	3	2	
Chabot, Thomas*	72	Canada	D	2016–present	569	78	257	335	270	10	1	3	4	4	Captain 2026–present
Chara, Zdeno†	3	Slovakia	D	2001–2006	299	51	95	146	554	45	3	11	14	57	Hockey Hall of Fame 2025
Chartier, Rourke	49	Canada	C	2022–2024	43	2	1	3	14	0	0	0	0	0	
Chasse, Denis	20	Canada	RW	1996–1997	22	1	4	5	19	0	0	0	0	0	
Cheechoo, Jonathan	41	Canada	C	2009–2010	61	5	9	14	20	1	0	0	0	0	
Chiasson, Alex	90	Canada	RW	2014–2016	153	19	21	40	112	4	0	0	0	0	
Chlapík, Filip	78	Czech Republic	C	2017–2021	57	5	6	11	18	0	0	0	0	0	
Chorske, Tom	17	United States	LW	1995–1997	140	33	22	55	37	5	0	1	1	2	
Chychrun, Jakob	6	Canada	D	2022–2024	94	16	30	46	68	0	0	0	0	0	
Ciernik, Ivan	24	Slovakia	LW	1997–2002	29	3	2	5	6	0	0	0	0	0	
Cimellaro, Tony	33	Canada	C	1992–1993	2	0	0	0	0	0	0	0	0	0	
Cirella, Joe	27	Canada	D	1995–1996	6	0	0	0	4	0	0	0	0	0	
Claesson, Fredrik	33	Sweden	D	2015–2018	113	4	16	20	41	14	0	3	3	4	
Coburn, Braydon	55	Canada	D	2020–2021	16	0	2	2	10	0	0	0	0	0	
Commodore, Mike	44	Canada	D	2007–2008	26	0	2	2	26	4	0	2	2	0	
Conacher, Cory	89	Canada	C	2012–2014	72	6	19	25	40	8	3	0	3	31	
Condra, Erik	22	United States	RW	2010–2015	299	33	54	87	136	23	3	6	9	2	
Comrie, Mike	89	Canada	C	2006–2007; 2008–2009	63	16	16	32	30	20	2	4	6	17	
Corvo, Joe	7	United States	D	2006–2008; 2013–2014	152	17	57	74	70	20	2	7	9	6	
Cousins, Nick*	21	Canada	C	2024–present	131	15	23	38	133	9	0	1	1	2	
Cowen, Jared	2	Canada	D	2009–2016	249	15	31	46	174	17	0	4	4	25	
Cozens, Dylan*	24	Canada	C	2024–present	103	33	42	75	65	10	3	1	4	12	
Crookshank, Angus	59	Canada	LW	2023–2025	21	2	2	4	4	0	0	0	0	0	
Crotty, Cameron	5	Canada	D	2025–2027	9	0	1	1	0	1	0	0	0	0	
Crowe, Phil	26	Canada	RW	1996–1999	43	3	2	5	58	3	0	0	0	16	
Cullen, Matt	7	United States	C	2009–2010	21	4	4	8	8	6	3	5	8	0	
Cunneyworth, Randy	7	Canada	LW	1994–1998	284	36	59	95	360	13	1	2	3	16	Captain 1994–1998
Da Costa, Stephane	24	France	C	2010–2014	47	7	4	11	10	0	0	0	0	0	
Dackell, Andreas	10	Sweden	RW	1996–2001	401	65	115	180	104	32	4	3	7	4	
Dadonov, Evgenii	63	Russia	RW	2020–2021	55	13	7	20	4	0	0	0	0	0	
Dahlman, Toni	10	Finland	RW	2001–2003	22	1	1	2	0	0	0	0	0	0	
Dahlquist, Chris	6	United States	D	1994–1996	70	2	8	10	50	0	0	0	0	0	
Daigle, Alexandre	9	Canada	RW	1993–1998	301	74	108	172	118	7	0	0	0	2	
Daugavins, Kaspars	23	Latvia	LW	2009–2013	85	6	8	14	21	1	0	0	0	0	
Davidsson, Jonathan	17	Sweden	C	2019–2020	6	0	1	1	0	0	0	0	0	0	
Davydov, Evgeny	11	Russia	D	1993–1995	43	6	9	15	38	0	0	0	0	0	
De Vries, Greg	5	Canada	D	2003–2004	13	0	1	1	6	7	0	1	1	8	
DeBrincat, Alex	12	United States	RW	2022–2023	82	27	39	66	45	0	0	0	0	0	
Del Zotto, Michael	15	Canada	D	2021–2022	26	3	10	13	4	0	0	0	0	0	
DeMelo, Dylan	2	Canada	D	2018–2020	126	4	28	32	63	0	0	0	0	0	
Demitra, Pavol	78	Slovakia	D	1993–1996	49	12	14	26	10	0	0	0	0	0	
DiDomenico, Chris	49	Canada	C	2016–2018	27	6	4	10	14	0	0	0	0	0	
Dineen, Gord	6	Canada	RW	1992–1994	109	2	25	27	119	0	0	0	0	0	Captain 1993–1994
Dineen, Kevin	9	Canada	D	1999–2000	67	4	8	12	57	0	0	0	0	0	
Dollas, Bobby	2	Canada	LW	1999–2000	1	0	0	0	0	0	0	0	0	0	
Donato, Ted	28	United States	RW	1998–1999	13	3	2	5	10	1	0	0	0	0	
Donovan, Jorian*	56	Canada	D	2025–present	2	0	0	0	0	0	0	0	0	0	
Donovan, Shean	10	Canada	C	2007–2010	177	12	15	27	147	6	1	0	1	2	
Drury, Ted	13	United States	D	1995–1996	42	9	7	16	54	0	0	0	0	0	
Duchene, Matt	95	Canada	C	2017–2019	118	50	57	107	20	0	0	0	0	0	
Duchesne, Steve	28	Canada	RW	1995–1997	140	31	52	83	80	7	1	4	5	0	
Duclair, Anthony	10	Canada	LW	2018–2020	87	31	23	54	20	0	0	0	0	0	
Dumont, Gabriel	40	Canada	C	2017–2018	30	1	1	2	6	0	0	0	0	0	
Dzingel, Ryan	18	United States	LW	2015–2019; 2020–2021	276	68	67	135	124	15	2	1	3	4	
Dziurzynski, David	59	Canada	LW	2012–2016	26	3	3	6	22	0	0	0	0	0	
Eaves, Patrick	44	United States	RW	2005–2008	157	38	33	71	64	17	1	2	3	12	
Eklund, William*	27	Sweden	LW	2026–present	0	0	0	0	0	0	0	0	0	0	
Eller, Lars	89	Denmark	C	2025–2026	68	5	10	15	12	4	0	0	0	0	
Elliott, Stefan	29	Canada	D	2018–2019	3	0	1	1	0	0	0	0	0	0	
Elynuik, Pat	25	Canada	RW	1994–1996	70	4	9	13	67	0	0	0	0	0	
Emerson, Nelson	7	Canada	RW	1998–1999	3	1	1	2	2	4	1	3	4	0	
Emmons, John	38	United States	RW	1999–2001	51	1	1	2	26	0	0	0	0	0	
Englund, Andreas	39	Sweden	D	2016–2020	33	0	3	3	24	0	0	0	0	0	
Ennis, Tyler	63	Canada	RW	2019–2020; 2021–2022	118	22	35	57	32	0	0	0	0	0	
Falk, Justin	42	Canada	D	2018–2019	10	0	0	0	11	0	0	0	0	0	
Falloon, Pat	12	Canada	D	1997–1998	28	3	3	6	8	1	0	0	0	0	
Filatov, Nikita	21	Russia	LW	2011–2012	9	0	1	1	4	0	0	0	0	0	
Filimonov, Dmitri	55	Russia	C	1993–1994	30	1	4	5	18	0	0	0	0	0	
Fisher, Mike	12	Canada	C	1999–2011	675	167	181	348	554	75	14	14	28	66	
Foegele, Warren*	37	Canada	LW	2025–present	21	6	2	8	4	4	0	0	0	0	
Foligno, Nick	71	Canada	LW	2007–2012	351	61	87	148	299	17	2	4	6	12	
Forbes, Colin	17	Canada	C	1999–2001	84	2	6	8	43	5	1	0	1	14	
Formenton, Alex	10	Canada	LW	2017–2022	109	23	16	39	71	0	0	0	0	0	
Fortier, Marc	9	Canada	C	1992–1993	10	0	1	1	6	0	0	0	0	0	
Freer, Mark	11	Canada	C	1992–1993	63	10	14	24	39	0	0	0	0	0	
Gaborik, Marian	12	Slovakia	LW	2017–2018	16	4	3	7	6	0	0	0	0	0	
Gagnon, Sean	3	Canada	C	2001–2002	5	0	0	0	13	0	0	0	0	0	
Galchenyuk, Alex	17	United States	LW	2020–2021	8	1	0	1	6	0	0	0	0	0	
Gambrell, Dylan	27	United States	C	2021–2023	123	7	10	17	47	0	0	0	0	0	
Gardiner, Bruce	25	Canada	RW	1996–2000	181	22	32	54	146	21	1	4	5	8	
Gaudette, Adam	81	United States	RW	2021–2022; 2024–2025	131	23	15	38	25	6	1	2	3	4	
Gaudreau, Rob	10	United States	RW	1994–1996	88	13	14	27	23	0	0	0	0	0	
Gauthier, Julien	77	Canada	RW	2022–2023	17	3	2	5	2	0	0	0	0	0	
Gibbons, Brian	17	United States	RW	2018–2019	20	6	8	14	4	0	0	0	0	0	
Gilbert, Dennis*	6	United States	D	2024–2025; 2025–2026	12	0	2	2	2	3	0	0	0	6	
Gilroy, Matt	97	United States	D	2011–2012	14	1	2	3	2	3	0	0	0	0	
Giroux, Claude*	28	Canada	RW	2022–present	327	85	157	242	100	10	1	4	5	0	
Glynn, Brian	23	Germany	D	1993–1994	48	2	13	15	41	0	0	0	0	0	
Goldmann, Erich	59	Germany	D	1999–2000	1	0	0	0	0	0	0	0	0	0	
Goloubef, Cody	29	Canada	D	2018–2020	29	1	1	2	10	0	0	0	0	0	
Gomez, Scott	23	United States	C	2015–2016	13	0	1	1	2	0	0	0	0	0	
Gonchar, Sergei	55	Russia	D	2010–2013	186	15	76	91	101	17	1	9	10	20	
Grant, Derek	57	Canada	C	2012–2015	25	0	2	2	4	0	0	0	0	0	
Greening, Colin	14	Canada	C	2010–2016	256	38	49	87	137	17	3	2	5	2	
Gregor, Noah	73	Canada	C	2024–2025	40	4	2	6	17	0	0	0	0	0	
Greig, Ridly*	71	Canada	C	2022–present	247	41	63	104	221	10	1	1	2	10	
Gruden, John	24	United States	RW	1998–2000	22	0	1	1	12	0	0	0	0	0	
Gryba, Eric	62	Canada	D	2012–2015	165	4	25	29	187	10	0	0	0	31	
Gudbranson, Erik	44	Canada	D	2020–2021	36	1	2	3	47	0	0	0	0	0	
Guenette, Maxence	50	Canada	D	2022–2024	8	0	0	0	2	0	0	0	0	0	
Guerard, Daniel	46	Canada	RW	1994–1995	2	0	0	0	0	0	0	0	0	0	
Gustafsson, Per	3	Sweden	D	1997–1998	9	0	1	1	6	1	0	0	0	0	
Hainsey, Ron	81	United States	D	2019–2020	64	1	11	12	12	0	0	0	0	0	
Hale, David	55	United States	D	2010–2011	25	1	4	5	6	0	0	0	0	0	
Haley, Micheal	38	Canada	C	2020–2021	4	0	0	0	5	0	0	0	0	0	
Halliday, Stephen*	83	Canada	C	2025–present	30	4	7	11	2	0	0	0	0	0	
Hamel, Denis	17	Canada	D	2003–2008	52	5	3	8	10	0	0	0	0	0	
Hammond, Ken	5	Canada	D	1992–1993	62	4	4	8	104	0	0	0	0	0	
Hamonic, Travis	23	Canada	D	2021–2025	182	10	27	37	158	0	0	0	0	0	
Hamr, Radek	5	Czech Republic	LW	1993–1994	11	0	0	0	0	0	0	0	0	0	
Hannan, Dave	14	Canada	LW	1996–1997	34	2	2	4	8	0	0	0	0	0	
Harpur, Ben	67	Canada	D	2015–2019	103	1	6	7	79	9	0	2	2	4	
Havlat, Martin	9	Czech Republic	LW	2000–2006	298	105	130	235	166	51	14	20	34	36	
Hawryluk, Jayce	79	Canada	RW	2019–2020	11	2	5	7	8	0	0	0	0	0	
Heatherington, Dillon	29	Canada	D	2021–2023	12	0	0	0	7	0	0	0	0	0	
Heatley, Dany	15	Canada	LW	2005–2009	317	180	182	362	308	34	10	25	35	31	
Hemsky, Ales	83	Czech Republic	RW	2013–2014	20	4	13	17	4	0	0	0	0	0	
Hennessy, Josh	36	United States	C	2007–2010	20	1	0	1	4	0	0	0	0	0	
Herperger, Chris	33	Canada	D	2001–2002	72	4	9	13	43	0	0	0	0	0	
Highmore, Matthew	15	Canada	C	2023–2025	48	2	6	8	10	1	0	0	0	4	
Hill, Sean	4	United States	D	1994–1998	143	9	29	38	134	0	0	0	0	0	
Hnidy, Shane	34	Canada	D	2000–2004	189	4	16	20	343	14	1	1	2	12	
Hodgson, Hayden*	42	Canada	RW	2024–present	12	0	0	0	16	0	0	0	0	0	
Hoffman, Mike	68	Canada	LW	2011–2018	342	107	123	230	119	25	7	7	14	12	
Holden, Nick	5	Canada	D	2021–2023	141	7	28	35	22	0	0	0	0	0	
Hossa, Marian†	18	Slovakia	LW	1997–2004	467	188	202	380	243	51	13	21	34	18	Hockey Hall of Fame 2020
Huard, Bill	28	Canada	LW	1993–1995	89	3	3	6	226	0	0	0	0	0	
Huffman, Kerry	5	Canada	RW	1993–1996	114	10	23	33	121	0	0	0	0	0	
Hull, Jody	16	Canada	RW	1992–1993; 2001–2004	164	18	31	49	34	14	1	1	2	2	
Imama, Bokondji	20	Canada	LW	2023–2024	6	0	0	0	7	0	0	0	0	0	
Jaros, Christian	83	Slovakia	D	2017–2020	76	1	12	13	33	0	0	0	0	0	
Jarventie, Roby	52	Finland	LW	2023–2024	7	0	1	1	4	0	0	0	0	0	
Jelinek, Tomas	25	Czech Republic	C	1992–1993	49	7	6	13	52	0	0	0	0	0	
Jenik, Jan	14	Czech Republic	C	2024–2025	2	0	0	0	0	0	0	0	0	0	
Jensen, Nick	3	United States	D	2024–2026	132	7	31	38	28	6	0	0	0	2	
Johansson, Andreas	21	Sweden	C	1998–1999	69	21	16	37	34	2	0	0	0	0	
Jokipakka, Jyrki	23	Finland	D	2016–2017	3	0	0	0	0	0	0	0	0	0	
Joseph, Mathieu	21	Canada	RW	2021–2024	139	18	47	65	93	0	0	0	0	0	
Juneau, Joe	28	Canada	C	1999–2000	65	13	24	37	22	6	2	1	3	0	
Kaigorodov, Alexei	55	Russia	LW	2006–2007	6	0	1	1	0	0	0	0	0	0	
Kaliyev, Arthur	34	United States	LW	2025–2026	2	0	1	1	0	0	0	0	0	0	
Karlsson, Erik	65	Sweden	D	2009–2018	627	126	392	518	316	48	6	31	37	26	Norris Trophy 2012, 2015; Captain 2014–2018
Kassian, Matt	28	Canada	LW	2012–2014	48	2	1	3	110	5	0	2	2	17	
Kastelic, Mark	47	United States	C	2021–2024	144	14	11	25	179	0	0	0	0	0	
Katchouk, Boris	14	Canada	LW	2023–2024	21	2	2	4	0	0	0	0	0	0	
Kekalainen, Jarmo	11	Finland	LW	1993–1994	28	1	5	6	14	0	0	0	0	0	
Keller, Ryan	44	Canada	RW	2009–2010	6	0	0	0	0	0	0	0	0	0	
Kelly, Chris	22	Canada	C	2003–2011; 2016–2017	545	80	108	188	272	38	4	9	13	8	
Kelly, Parker	45	Canada	C	2020–2024	177	17	18	35	127	0	0	0	0	0	
Kleven, Tyler*	43	United States	D	2022–present	166	7	24	31	84	8	0	2	2	8	
Klinkhammer, Rob	36	Canada	LW	2011–2012	15	0	2	2	2	0	0	0	0	0	
Konopka, Zenon	28	Canada	LW	2011–2012	55	3	2	5	193	6	0	2	2	2	
Konroyd, Steve	24	Canada	D	1993–1994	8	0	2	2	2	0	0	0	0	0	
Kostka, Mike	21	Canada	D	2015–2017	15	0	1	1	4	0	0	0	0	0	
Kovalev, Alexei	27	Russia	RW	2009–2011	131	32	44	76	82	0	0	0	0	0	
Kravchuk, Igor	29	Russia	C	1997–2001	239	19	65	84	74	21	3	4	7	4	
Kuba, Filip	17	Czech Republic	D	2008–2012	261	14	102	116	98	7	0	2	2	10	
Kubalik, Dominik	81	Czech Republic	LW	2023–2024	74	11	4	15	19	0	0	0	0	0	
Kudelski, Bob	26	United States	D	1992–1994	90	47	29	76	36	0	0	0	0	0	
Kwiatkowski, Joel	29	Canada	D	2000–2003	35	1	2	3	18	0	0	0	0	0	
Kyte, Jim	2	Canada	LW	1992–1993	4	0	1	1	4	0	0	0	0	0	
Lacroix, Eric	17	Canada	LW	2000–2001	9	0	1	1	4	4	0	1	1	0	
Laich, Brooks	29	Canada	C	2003–2004	1	0	0	0	2	0	0	0	0	0	
Lajoie, Max	58	Canada	D	2018–2020	62	7	8	15	20	0	0	0	0	0	
Lamb, Mark	7	Canada	C	1992–1994	137	18	37	55	120	0	0	0	0	0	Captain 1993–1994
Lambert, Denny	28	Canada	D	1996–1998	152	13	26	39	467	17	0	1	1	28	
Lammens, Hank	27	Canada	D	1993–1994	27	1	2	3	22	0	0	0	0	0	
Langfeld, Josh	36	Canada	D	2001–2004	51	7	11	18	22	0	0	0	0	0	
Laperriere, Daniel	24	Canada	D	1994–1996	19	1	1	2	4	0	0	0	0	0	
Lapointe, Martin	28	Canada	RW	2007–2008	18	3	3	6	23	4	0	0	0	4	
Larouche, Steve	74	Canada	C	1994–1995	18	8	7	15	6	0	0	0	0	0	
Larsson, Jacob	32	Sweden	D	2022–2023	7	0	0	0	6	0	0	0	0	0	
Latendresse, Guillaume	73	Canada	RW	2012–2013	27	6	4	10	8	3	1	1	2	6	
Lauer, Brad	16	Canada	LW	1993–1994	30	2	5	7	6	0	0	0	0	0	
Laukkanen, Janne	27	Finland	D	1995–2000	263	9	59	68	249	22	2	3	5	18	
Lavoie, Dominic	21	Canada	D	1992–1993	2	0	1	1	0	0	0	0	0	0	
Lazar, Curtis	27	Canada	C	2014–2017	176	12	24	36	36	6	0	0	0	2	
Lazaro, Jeff	28	United States	RW	1992–1993	26	6	4	10	16	0	0	0	0	0	
Leach, Steve	28	United States	RW	1998–1999	9	0	2	2	6	0	0	0	0	0	
Ledyard, Grant	2	Canada	D	1999–2000	40	2	4	6	8	6	0	0	0	16	
Lee, Brian	5	United States	D	2007–2012	167	5	23	28	100	4	0	0	0	2	
Legwand, David	17	United States	C	2014–2015	80	9	18	27	32	3	0	0	0	0	
Leroux, Francois	29	Canada	D	1993–1994	23	0	1	1	70	0	0	0	0	0	
Leschyshyn, Curtis	7	Canada	D	2000–2005	200	3	23	26	78	36	0	2	2	10	
Lessard, Francis	49	Canada	RW	2010–2011	24	0	0	0	78	0	0	0	0	0	
Levins, Scott	26	United States	RW	1993–1996	84	8	12	21	224	0	0	0	0	0	
Lindberg, Oscar	24	Sweden	C	2018–2019	20	5	3	8	4	0	0	0	0	0	
Loach, Lonnie	24	Canada	LW	1992–1993	3	0	0	0	0	0	0	0	0	0	
Locke, Corey	37	Canada	C	2010–2011	5	0	1	1	0	0	0	0	0	0	
Lodin, Viktor	42	Sweden	C	2021–2022	1	0	0	0	0	0	0	0	0	0	
Loewen, Darcy	10	Canada	LW	1992–1994	123	4	8	12	197	0	0	0	0	0	
Lucchini, Jake	36	Canada	C	2022–2023	11	1	0	1	0	0	0	0	0	0	
Lundin, Mike	10	United States	D	2012–2013	11	0	1	1	0	0	0	0	0	0	
Luongo, Chris	23	United States	D	1992–1993	76	3	9	12	68	0	0	0	0	0	
Lycksell, Olle	15	Sweden	RW	2025–2026	7	1	1	2	0	0	0	0	0	0	
MacArthur, Clarke	16	Canada	LW	2013–2017	149	40	51	91	114	25	5	6	11	30	
MacDermid, Kurtis*	23	Canada	LW	2025–present	19	0	1	1	33	0	0	0	0	0	
MacDonald, Kevin	2	Canada	D	1993–1994	1	0	0	0	2	0	0	0	0	0	
MacEwen, Zack	17	Canada	C	2023–2025	51	4	2	6	78	0	0	0	0	0	
Maciver, Norm	22	Canada	D	1992–1995	161	24	73	97	120	0	0	0	0	0	
Malec, Tomas	41	Slovakia	D	2005–2007	3	0	0	0	2	0	0	0	0	0	
Mallette, Troy	18	Canada	LW	1993–1996	169	12	24	36	372	0	0	0	0	0	
Marsh, Brad	14	Canada	D	1992–1993	59	0	3	3	30	0	0	0	0	0	
Martins, Steve	21	Canada	C	1998–2006	70	9	7	16	24	2	0	0	0	0	
Matinpalo, Nikolas*	33	Finland	D	2023–present	95	1	8	9	36	10	0	0	0	4	
Mayer, Derek	9	Canada	D	1993–1994	17	2	2	4	8	0	0	0	0	0	
McAmmond, Dean	37	Canada	C	2006–2009	193	27	32	58	56	22	5	3	8	15	
McBain, Andrew	20	Canada	RW	1992–1994	114	18	26	42	107	0	0	0	0	0	
McCleary, Trent	20	Canada	RW	1995–1996	75	4	10	14	68	0	0	0	0	0	
McCormick, Max	89	United States	LW	2015–2019	71	6	4	10	78	0	0	0	0	0	
McEachern, Shawn	15	United States	LW	1996–2002	454	142	162	304	184	44	4	13	17	30	
McGrattan, Brian	16	Canada	RW	2006–2008	143	2	8	10	287	0	0	0	0	0	
McLlwain, Dave	17	Canada	C	1993–1996	110	22	33	55	72	0	0	0	0	0	
Meszaros, Andrej	14	Slovakia	D	2006–2008	246	26	84	110	213	34	2	7	9	36	
Mete, Victor	98	Canada	D	2020–2022	51	1	8	9	6	0	0	0	0	0	
Methot, Marc	3	Canada	D	2012–2017	304	14	55	69	125	34	3	6	9	22	
Michalek, Milan	9	Czech Republic	LW	2009–2016	412	115	109	224	202	24	5	3	8	10	
Miller, Brad	55	Canada	D	1992–1993	11	0	0	0	42	0	0	0	0	0	
Miller, Kevin	21	United States	C	1999–2000	9	3	2	5	2	1	0	0	0	0	
Modry, Jaroslav	23	Czech Republic	D	1995–1996	64	4	14	18	38	0	0	0	0	0	
Motte, Tyler	14	United States	LW	2022–2023	38	3	6	9	4	0	0	0	0	0	
Muckalt, Bill	17	Canada	RW	2001–2002	70	0	8	8	46	0	0	0	0	0	
Murphy, Rob	18	Canada	C	1992–1993	44	3	7	10	30	0	0	0	0	0	
Murray, Chris	17	Canada	RW	1997–1999	84	6	9	15	161	11	1	0	1	8	
Murray, Troy	33	Canada	C	1993–1995	48	6	13	19	20	0	0	0	0	0	
Musil, Frank	3	Czech Republic	D	1995–1997	122	1	8	9	143	0	0	0	0	0	
Namestnikov, Vladislav	90	Russia	LW	2019–2020	54	13	12	25	35	0	0	0	0	0	
Neckar, Stan	24	Czech Republic	D	1994–1999	198	6	16	22	126	9	0	0	0	2	
Neil, Chris†	25	Canada	RW	2001–2017	1,026	112	138	250	2,522	95	9	10	19	204	#25 Retired 2023
Nikulin, Alexander	41	Russia	C	2007–2008	2	0	0	0	0	0	0	0	0	0	
Norris, Josh	9	United States	C	2019–2025	236	90	66	156	91	0	0	0	0	0	
Norton, Brad	33	United States	D	2005–2006	7	0	0	0	31	0	0	0	0	0	
Novak, Filip	17	Czech Republic	D	2005–2006	11	0	0	0	4	0	0	0	0	0	
Nycholat, Lawrence	3	Canada	D	2007–2008	4	0	0	0	0	0	0	0	0	0	
O'Brien, Jim	18	United States	C	2010–2014; 2017–2018	73	8	5	13	14	7	0	1	1	0	
Oduya, Johnny	29	Sweden	D	2017–2018	51	4	4	8	32	0	0	0	0	0	
Oliver, David	12	Canada	RW	1998–2001	24	2	5	7	6	0	0	0	0	0	
Olsson, Christer	23	Sweden	D	1996–1997	25	2	3	5	10	0	0	0	0	0	
Osiecki, Mark	28	United States	D	1992–1993	34	0	4	4	12	0	0	0	0	0	
Ostapchuk, Zack	38	Canada	C	2023–2025	50	1	3	4	26	0	0	0	0	0	
Paajarvi, Magnus	56	Sweden	LW	2017–2019	115	17	10	27	10	0	0	0	0	0	
Paek, Jim	2	South Korea	D	1994–1995	29	0	2	2	28	0	0	0	0	0	
Pageau, Jean-Gabriel	44	Canada	C	2012–2020	428	87	95	182	153	35	12	4	16	24	
Pankewicz, Greg	33	Canada	RW	1993–1994	3	0	0	0	2	0	0	0	0	0	
Paquette, Cedric	23	Canada	C	2020–2021	9	1	0	1	4	0	0	0	0	0	
Paul, Nick	13	Canada	LW	2015–2022	227	29	37	66	75	0	0	0	0	0	
Payer, Serge	43	Canada	C	2006–2007	10	0	1	1	2	0	0	0	0	0	
Paynter, Kent	3	Canada	D	1992–1994	15	0	1	1	28	0	0	0	0	0	
Peca, Matthew	53	Canada	RW	2019–2021	14	0	3	3	0	0	0	0	0	0	
Peluso, Mike	44	United States	D	1992–1993	81	15	10	25	318	0	0	0	0	0	
Penney, Chad	25	Canada	LW	1993–1994	3	0	0	0	2	0	0	0	0	0	
Perron, David	57	Canada	LW	2024–2026	92	19	22	41	34	6	2	1	3	4	
Persson, Ricard	27	Sweden	D	2000–2002	206	11	32	43	148	13	0	1	1	19	
Petersson, Andre	20	Sweden	RW	2011–2012	1	0	0	0	0	0	0	0	0	0	
Phaneuf, Dion	2	Canada	D	2015–2018	153	13	41	54	157	19	1	4	5	17	
Phillips, Chris†	4	Canada	D	1997–2015	1,179	71	217	288	758	114	6	9	15	105	#4 Retired 2020
Picard, Alexandre R.	45	Canada	D	2008–2010	92	10	19	29	23	0	0	0	0	0	
Picard, Michel	49	Canada	LW	1994–1996	41	7	14	21	24	0	0	0	0	0	
Pinto, Shane*	57	United States	C	2020–present	282	74	79	153	112	10	1	1	2	4	
Pitlick, Lance	2	United States	D	1994–1999	228	11	25	36	190	20	0	1	1	21	
Pothier, Brian	2	United States	D	2002–2006	146	9	40	49	89	16	2	1	3	10	
Potulny, Ryan	21	United States	C	2010–2011	7	0	0	0	0	0	0	0	0	0	
Preissing, Tom	42	United States	D	2006–2007	80	7	31	38	18	20	2	5	7	10	
Prince, Shane	10	United States	LW	2014–2016	44	3	10	13	6	0	0	0	0	0	
Prospal, Vaclav	13	Czech Republic	LW	1997–2001	213	34	77	111	114	16	0	4	4	4	
Puempel, Matt	26	Canada	LW	2014–2017	52	4	2	6	24	0	0	0	0	0	
Pyatt, Tom	10	Canada	C	2016–2019	200	16	31	47	28	14	2	0	2	0	
Quinn, Dan	7	Canada	C	1993–1996	41	13	18	31	30	0	0	0	0	0	
Rachunek, Karel	23	Czech Republic	D	1999–2004	246	11	86	97	145	20	1	3	4	14	
Raglan, Herb	25	Canada	RW	1993–1994	29	0	0	0	52	0	0	0	0	0	
Ray, Rob	32	Canada	RW	2003–2004	11	1	0	1	18	0	0	0	0	0	
Redden, Wade	6	Canada	D	1996–2008	838	101	309	410	576	94	12	34	45	55	
Regin, Peter	13	Denmark	C	2008–2013	178	19	36	55	44	6	3	1	4	6	
Reilly, Mike	5	United States	D	2019–2021	70	1	30	31	36	0	0	0	0	0	
Reinhardt, Cole	51	Canada	LW	2021–2025	18	1	1	2	17	0	0	0	0	0	
Richardson, Luke	2	Canada	D	2007–2008	76	2	7	9	41	0	0	0	0	0	
Rivers, Jamie	22	Canada	D	2000–2002	47	2	4	6	48	1	0	0	0	4	
Robinson, Buddy	55	United States	RW	2015–2017	7	1	1	2	6	0	0	0	0	0	
Robitaille, Randy	27	Canada	C	2007–2008	68	10	19	29	18	2	0	1	1	0	
Rodewald, Jack	53	Canada	RW	2017–2020	10	0	0	0	2	0	0	0	0	0	
Roy, Andre	26	Canada	LW	1999–2002	193	13	16	29	462	7	0	0	0	18	
Roy, Jean-Yves	14	Canada	RW	1995–1996	4	1	1	2	2	0	0	0	0	0	
Rumble, Darren	34	Canada	D	1992–1994	139	9	22	31	177	0	0	0	0	0	
Rundblad, David	7	Sweden	D	2011–2012	24	1	3	4	6	0	0	0	0	0	
Ruutu, Jarkko	73	Finland	LW	2008–2011	210	21	36	57	324	6	2	1	3	34	
Ruzicka, Vladimír	38	Czech Republic	C	1993–1994	42	5	13	18	14	0	0	0	0	0	
Ryan, Bobby	9	United States	RW	2013–2020	455	107	159	266	192	25	8	9	17	14	Bill Masterton Trophy 2020
Sabourin, Scott	49	Canada	RW	2019–2020; 2021–2022	42	2	6	8	44	0	0	0	0	0	
Salo, Sami	5	Finland	D	1998–2002	195	19	50	36	67	26	3	2	5	4	
Sanderson, Jake*	85	United States	D	2022–present	303	39	142	181	55	9	1	4	5	4	
Sanford, Zach	13	United States	LW	2021–2022	62	9	8	17	37	0	0	0	0	0	
Saprykin, Oleg	61	Russia	LW	2006–2007	12	1	1	2	4	15	1	1	2	4	
Sarault, Yves	23	Canada	LW	1998–2000	22	0	3	3	11	0	0	0	0	0	
Schaefer, Peter	27	Canada	LW	2002–2007	315	53	105	158	130	53	5	15	20	34	
Schastlivy, Petr	19	Russia	LW	1999–2004	107	16	22	38	26	1	0	0	0	0	
Schneider, Andy	9	Canada	LW	1993–1994	10	0	0	0	15	0	0	0	0	0	
Schubert, Christoph	5	Germany	D	2006–2009	268	23	42	65	194	31	0	2	2	34	
Sebrango, Donovan	37	Canada	D	2024–2026	4	0	0	0	0	0	0	0	0	0	
Senyshyn, Zachary	56	Canada	RW	2021–2022	2	0	0	0	2	0	0	0	0	0	
Sexton, Ben	26	Canada	C	2017–2019	2	0	0	0	0	0	0	0	0	0	
Shannon, Ryan	26	United States	RW	2008–2011	180	24	39	63	46	2	0	0	0	0	
Shaw, Brad	4	Canada	D	1992–1995	149	11	53	64	93	0	0	0	0	0	Captain 1993–1994
Shaw, Logan	20	Canada	RW	2021–2022	17	1	2	3	2	0	0	0	0	0	
Shore, Nick	23	United States	C	2017–2018	6	0	1	1	0	0	0	0	0	0	
Sieloff, Patrick	50	United States	D	2017–2019	1	1	0	1	0	0	0	0	0	0	
Silfverberg, Jakob	33	Sweden	LW	2011–2013	48	10	9	19	12	12	2	2	4	4	
Sillinger, Mike	16	Canada	C	2000–2001	13	3	4	7	4	4	0	0	0	2	
Simpson, Todd	27	Canada	D	2003–2004	16	0	1	1	47	0	0	0	0	0	
Smail, Doug	9	Canada	LW	1992–1993	51	4	10	14	51	0	0	0	0	0	
Smejkal, Jiri	13	Czech Republic	LW	2023–2024	20	1	1	2	4	0	0	0	0	0	
Smith, Derek	51	Canada	D	2009–2011	11	0	1	1	0	0	0	0	0	0	
Smith, Jason	21	Canada	D	2008–2009	63	1	0	1	47	0	0	0	0	0	
Smith, Zack	15	Canada	C	2008–2019	612	94	99	193	693	45	2	7	9	58	
Smolinski, Bryan	21	United States	C	2002–2006	171	39	63	102	97	35	6	11	17	12	
Smyth, Brad	38	Canada	RW	2002–2003	12	3	1	4	15	0	0	0	0	0	
Sokolov, Egor	75	Russia	LW	2021–2023	13	1	1	2	4	0	0	0	0	0	
Spence, Jordan*	10	Canada	D	2025–present	73	7	24	31	22	4	0	0	0	2	
Spezza, Jason	19	Canada	C	2002–2014	686	251	436	687	434	56	17	35	52	26	Captain 2013–2014
St. Amour, Martin	21	Canada	LW	1992–1993	1	0	0	0	2	0	0	0	0	0	
St. Pierre, Martin	37	Canada	C	2009–2010	3	0	0	0	0	0	0	0	0	0	
Stalberg, Viktor	24	Sweden	RW	2016–2017	18	2	2	4	8	17	0	2	2	2	
Stanley, Hoyt*	73	Canada	D	2026–present	0	0	0	0	0	0	0	0	0	0	
Stepan, Derek	15	United States	C	2020–2021	20	1	5	6	8	0	0	0	0	0	
Stillman, Cory	61	Canada	C	2007–2008	24	3	16	19	10	4	2	0	2	2	
Stone, Mark	61	Canada	RW	2011–2019	366	123	188	311	115	27	5	8	13	22	
Straka, Martin	82	Czech Republic	C	1994–1996	49	10	17	27	29	0	0	0	0	0	
Stutzle, Tim*	18	Germany	C	2020–present	447	149	260	409	218	10	2	4	6	2	
Sutton, Andy	5	Canada	D	2009–2010	18	1	0	1	34	6	0	0	0	8	
Svatos, Marek	10	Slovakia	RW	2010–2011	19	3	2	5	8	0	0	0	0	0	
Szwarz, Jordan	27	Canada	RW	2019–2020	3	0	0	0	2	0	0	0	0	0	
Tarasenko, Vladimir	91	Russia	RW	2023–2024	57	17	24	41	12	0	0	0	0	0	
Tetarenko, Joey	36	Canada	RW	2002–2003	2	0	0	0	5	0	0	0	0	0	
Thompson, Nate	17	United States	C	2017–2018	43	4	7	11	10	0	0	0	0	0	
Thomson, Jim	33	Canada	RW	2002–2003	15	0	1	1	41	0	0	0	0	0	
Thomson, Lassi	60	Finland	D	2021–2023; 2025–2026	29	0	8	8	6	1	0	0	0	0	
Tierney, Chris	71	Canada	C	2018–2022	277	32	90	122	68	0	0	0	0	0	
Tkachuk, Brady	7	United States	LW	2018–2026	572	213	250	463	821	10	4	3	7	19	Captain 2021–2026
Tomasino, Philip*	62	Canada	C	2026–present	0	0	0	0	0	0	0	0	0	0	
Tormanen, Antti	10	Finland	LW	1995–1996	50	7	8	15	28	0	0	0	0	0	
Townshend, Graeme	12	Jamaica	RW	1993–1994	14	0	0	0	9	0	0	0	0	0	
Traverse, Patrick	3	Canada	D	1995–2000	117	7	26	33	45	6	0	0	0	2	
Turgeon, Sylvain	61	Canada	LW	1992–1995	152	47	41	88	185	0	0	0	0	0	
Turris, Kyle	7	Canada	C	2011–2018	407	117	156	273	207	42	12	12	24	58	
Van Allen, Shaun	22	Canada	C	1996–2000; 2003–2004	545	55	113	158	331	53	1	5	6	37	
Van Drunen, David	52	Canada	D	1999–2000	1	0	0	0	0	0	0	0	0	0	
Varada, Vaclav	26	Czech Republic	LW	2003–2006	117	12	27	39	84	33	3	7	10	34	
Varone, Phil	81	Canada	C	2015–2017	8	0	1	1	2	0	0	0	0	0	
Vauclair, Julien	42	Switzerland	D	2003–2004	1	0	0	0	2	0	0	0	0	0	
Vermette, Antoine	20	Canada	C	2003–2009	359	80	87	161	205	38	4	4	8	18	
Veronneau, Max	14	Canada	D	2018–2020	16	2	2	4	0	0	0	0	0	0	
Vial, Dennis	21	Canada	D	1993–1998	176	3	14	17	625	0	0	0	0	0	
Volchenkov, Anton	24	Russia	D	2002–2010	428	16	78	94	299	61	3	12	15	48	
Von Stefenelli, Phil	29	Canada	D	1996–1997	6	0	1	1	7	0	0	0	0	0	
Watson, Austin	16	United States	LW	2020–2023	176	22	15	37	254	0	0	0	0	0	
White, Colin	36	United States	C	2016–2022	224	36	62	98	91	1	0	0	0	0	
White, Todd	28	Canada	C	2000-2004	230	58	86	144	78	39	8	3	11	16	
Wick, Roman	43	Switzerland	RW	2010–2011	7	0	0	0	0	0	0	0	0	0	
Wideman, Chris	6	United States	D	2015–2019	175	16	27	43	98	15	1	3	4	4	
Wiercioch, Patrick	46	Canada	D	2010–2016	211	12	50	62	115	7	2	2	4	4	
Winchester, Jesse	18	Canada	C	2007–2012	233	11	41	52	121	10	0	0	0	0	
Wingels, Tommy	57	United States	C	2016–2017	36	2	2	4	12	9	0	0	0	4	
Wolanin, Christian	86	Canada	D	2017–2021	58	5	13	18	12	0	0	0	0	0	
Yakemchuk, Carter*	58	Canada	D	2025–present	4	1	1	2	2	1	0	2	2	0	
Yashin, Alexei	19	Russia	C	1993–2001	586	218	273	491	222	26	6	9	15	20	Captain 1998–1999
Ylonen, Juha	36	Finland	C	2001–2002	15	1	1	2	2	12	0	5	5	2	
York, Jason	33	Canada	D	1996–2001	232	18	69	87	180	14	1	3	4	10	
Zaitsev, Nikita	22	Russia	D	2019–2023	203	7	38	45	84	0	0	0	0	0	
Zamuner, Rob	7	Canada	LW	1999–2001	136	28	30	58	84	10	2	0	2	8	
Zent, Jason	38	United States	LW	1996–1998	25	3	3	6	13	0	0	0	0	0	
Zetterlund, Fabian*	20	Sweden	LW	2024–present	102	19	19	38	20	10	0	0	0	2	
Zholtok, Sergei	26	Latvia	C	1996–1998	135	22	29	51	35	18	1	3	4	0	
Zibanejad, Mika	93	Sweden	C	2011–2016	281	64	87	151	64	16	2	6	8	0	
Zub, Artem*	2	Russia	D	2020–present	387	24	90	114	248	7	0	1	1	2	
Zubov, Ilya	53	Russia	C	2007–2009	12	0	2	2	0	0	0	0	0	0	

== See also ==
- List of Ottawa Senators (original) players
