= Ray Emery =

Canadian ice hockey player (1982–2018)

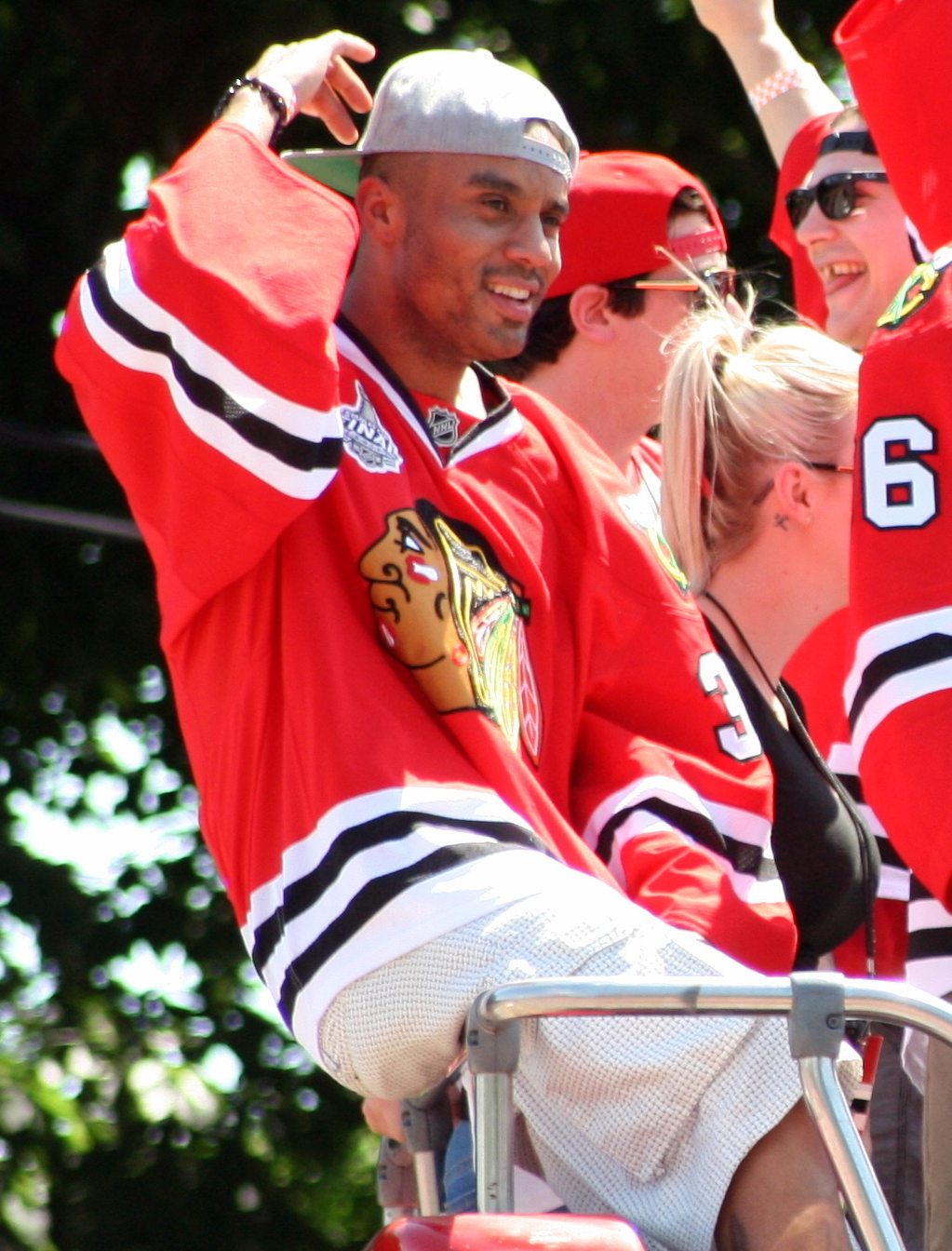
- Emery at the Chicago Blackhawks' 2013 Stanley Cup parade
- Born: September 28, 1982 Hamilton, Ontario, Canada
- Died: July 15, 2018 (aged 35) Hamilton, Ontario, Canada
- Height: 6 ft 2 in (188 cm)
- Weight: 196 lb (89 kg; 14 st 0 lb)
- Position: Goaltender
- Caught: Left
- Played for: Ottawa Senators; Atlant Moscow Oblast; Philadelphia Flyers; Anaheim Ducks; Chicago Blackhawks; Adler Mannheim
- NHL draft: 99th overall, 2001; Ottawa Senators
- Playing career: 2002–2016

Raymond Robert Emery (né Nichols; September 28, 1982 – July 15, 2018) was a Canadian professional ice hockey player who was a goaltender in the National Hockey League (NHL) for eleven seasons, between 2003 and 2015. Emery was chosen 99th overall by the Ottawa Senators in the 2001 NHL entry draft. During the 2006–07 season, he gained the starting job and backstopped his team to the Stanley Cup Final, the first appearance in the final for the current Senators' franchise. However, in the subsequent season, he lost his place as the team's starting goaltender due to an injury. He won a Stanley Cup championship with the Chicago Blackhawks in 2013.

In 2013, Emery won the William M. Jennings Trophy along with teammate Corey Crawford, awarded to the goaltender or goaltenders who give up the fewest goals in the season. Emery was a two-time Bill Masterton Memorial Trophy finalist for his dedication and perseverance. His teammates and fans often referred to him as "Razor" or "Sugar Ray" for his aggressive playing style.

== Early life ==
Emery was born Raymond Robert Nichols on September 28, 1982, in Hamilton, Ontario. His mother, Sharlene worked as an overhead crane operator at a Dofasco steel mill when she became pregnant at 20. His biological father had no interest in raising a child, and abandoned them. In 1984, Sharlene met Paul Emery whom she married in 1986. Raymond was adopted by Paul and took his surname shortly afterward. Emery had two younger brothers, Andrew and Nicholas. The family lived in a century-old farmhouse near the town of Cayuga.

Emery excelled in school, and was offered a scholarship. He played many sports other than ice hockey, including golf, baseball, and soccer. In hockey, he originally played as a defenceman, but switched to goaltender at nine years old due to a shortage of goaltenders in his league.

== Playing career ==
=== Pre-NHL ===
Emery committed to hockey on the advice of his mother, after a potential scholarship during his pursuit for higher education pushed him to take advantage of his athletic ability. At 16 years old, Emery landed with the Ontario Junior Hockey League Junior C Dunnville Terriers after unsuccessfully trying out for eight different junior teams. Emery was named the league's Rookie of the Year.

The Ontario Hockey League (OHL)'s Sault Ste. Marie Greyhounds drafted Emery in the fifth round of the 1999 OHL Draft. Emery split the 1999–2000 season between the Welland Cougars of the OHA and the Greyhounds in the OHL. In 2000–01, he played with the Greyhounds. During his last season in junior hockey, 2001–02, Emery gained notoriety for his fighting ability. He was named the OHL's Goaltender of the Year, setting a record of 33 wins and a GAA of 2.73.

Emery was selected in the fourth round, 99th overall by the Ottawa Senators in the 2001 NHL entry draft. In 2002–03, Emery joined the Binghamton Senators of the American Hockey League (AHL) and immediately assumed the position of starting goaltender for his first professional season with the team. He was named to the AHL All-Star team, made the league's all-rookie team and became Binghamton's MVP.

Emery was suspended twice for on-ice incidents in the same season, once for bumping a referee which resulted in a three-game suspension; the second time for an altercation with Denis Hamel of the Rochester Americans who admitted uttering a racial slur. Emery retaliated and was suspended for three games. Emery and Hamel later became teammates in Binghamton, and Hamel apologized "for not thinking about what [he] was saying, in the heat of a game".

=== Ottawa Senators (2005–2008) ===
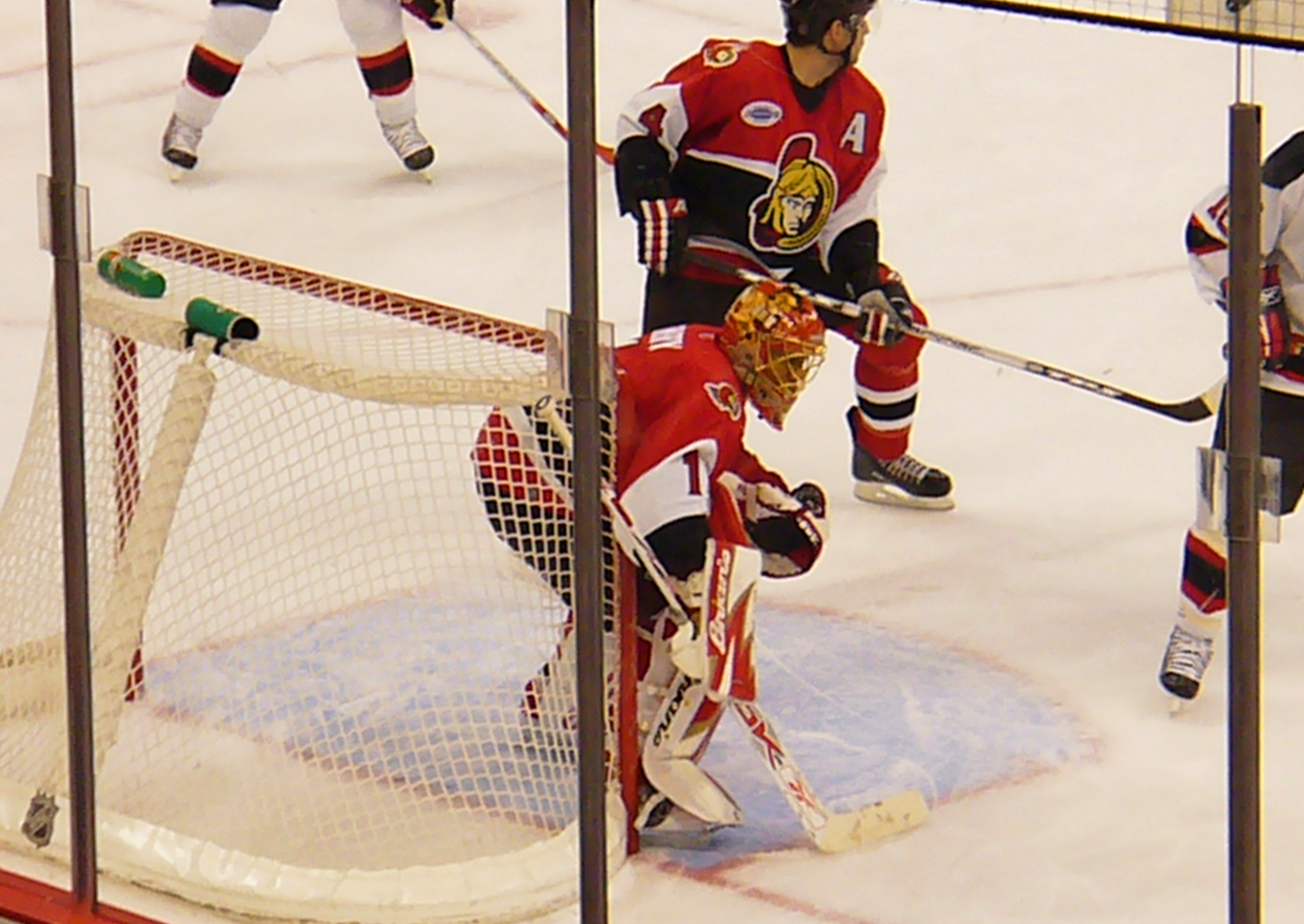
Emery in goal against the New Jersey Devils in the second round of 2007 playoffs

Emery began his NHL career with the Ottawa Senators in 2005–06. He set a record for wins to start an NHL goaltending career, winning his first nine games, moving ahead of Bob Froese who had won his first eight games in the 1982–83 season. In March of the same season, Emery won twelve games, tying Bernie Parent's 1974 record for the most wins in a month.

At the beginning of the 2005–06 season, Emery had won nine straight games during the regular season as the back-up to Dominik Hašek. When Hašek injured his groin during the 2006 Winter Olympics, Emery became Ottawa's de facto starter, with Mike Morrison, claimed off of waivers from the Edmonton Oilers, as Emery's backup. Emery was the starting goaltender for the rest of the season, leading the Senators to the second round of the 2006 Stanley Cup playoffs.

After the 2005–06 season, the Senators opted not to bring back Hašek, instead acquiring Martin Gerber to compete with Emery for the starter position. Gerber was the starter at the beginning of the season, but due to his poor play, Emery replaced him in mid-November. On February 10, 2007, Emery was suspended for three games from the NHL for striking Montreal Canadiens forward Maxim Lapierre in the face with his stick after Lapierre crashed into Emery's net.

Twelve days later, after his suspension had ended, Emery was involved in a fight between the Senators and the Buffalo Sabres. He and Sabres goaltender Martin Biron left their creases to fight each other. After this was finished, Sabres enforcer Andrew Peters grabbed Emery and connected with ten hard punches to the head; Emery did not directly punch Peters. Both goaltenders received game misconducts, and Emery had the rare feat (for a goaltender) of receiving two five-minute majors for fighting in the same incident. In total, Emery received 22 penalty minutes (two five-minute majors for fighting, a two-minute minor for leaving the crease and the 10-minute game misconduct) for this altercation. After the altercation, fans and media dubbed him "Sugar Ray" in reference to retired boxer Sugar Ray Robinson and Emery's reputation as a fighter. Then-teammate Brian McGrattan opined that if Emery were a position player and not a goalie, he would likely rank among the top five fighters in the NHL.

Prior to the 2007 playoffs, Emery and the Senators won 5–2 against Montreal on March 30, 2007, which was his 100th NHL game. Emery's strong play in the season continued in the playoffs, as the Senators defeated the Pittsburgh Penguins, New Jersey Devils and Buffalo Sabres each in five-game series in the first three rounds en route to their first Stanley Cup Final appearance since the team was founded in 1992, where the Senators ultimately lost to the Anaheim Ducks in five games. He became a restricted free agent after the end of the season and filed for salary arbitration, later agreeing to a three-year deal with the Senators worth CA$9.5 million before the hearings were held.

By the pre-season of the 2007–08 campaign, Emery had suffered a wrist injury that limited him to just 40 minutes of the pre-season and forced him to miss several games early in the Senators' season. On April 18, 2008, Murray announced to the media in an end-of-season press conference that Emery would not return to the Senators for the 2008–09 season. On June 20, 2008, Emery was waived by the Senators; he cleared waivers three days later and became a free agent as a result.

=== Atlant Moscow (2008–2009) ===
Emery signed a one-year, $2 million contract with Atlant Moscow Oblast of the newly formed Kontinental Hockey League (KHL) on July 9, 2008. After giving up five goals during a game, he chased a trainer who attempted to put a sponsored cap on Emery's head. As a foreign goaltender, Emery was allowed to play in only 65% of his team's 56 regular season games due to rules that encourage the development of Russian goaltenders. He split duties for the season with former Colorado Avalanche goaltender Vitaly Kolesnik and completed the season as a top goaltender in the KHL with a .926 save percentage and a 1.86 GAA.

=== Philadelphia Flyers (2009–2010) ===
On June 10, 2009, the Philadelphia Flyers announced that they had agreed to terms with Emery on a one-year contract worth $1.5 million. On December 8, Emery was placed on injured reserve to have surgery on a torn muscle in his abdomen. Originally expected to miss about six weeks, the prognosis changed when it was discovered that he had avascular necrosis of the hip. In March 2010, Flyers general manager Paul Holmgren announced that Emery would be out for the remainder of the season due to the diagnosis and that a bone graft would be carried out.

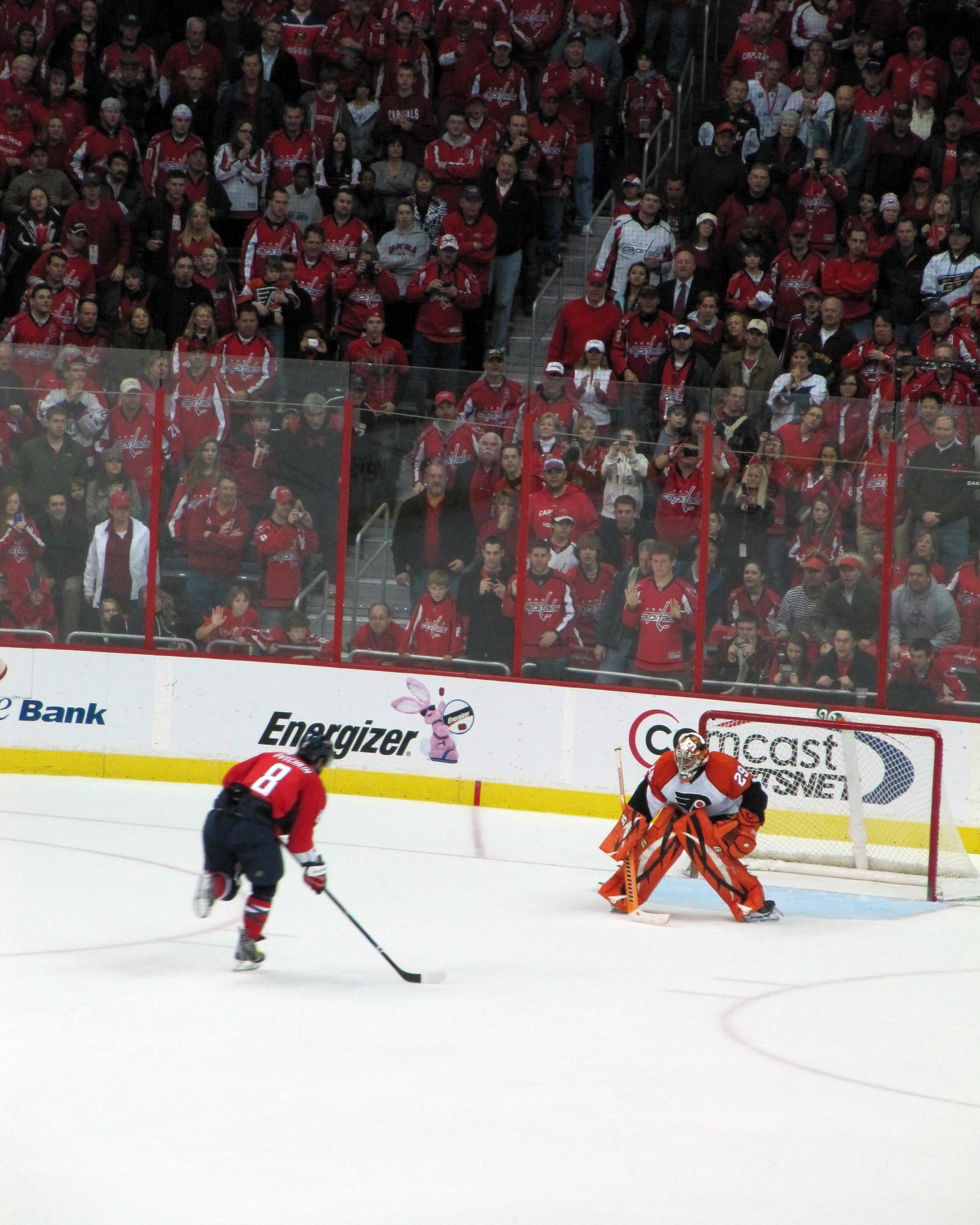
Emery facing Washington Capitals captain Alexander Ovechkin during a shootout in January 2010 as a member of the Philadelphia Flyers

Doctors were able to catch the disease before it spread, unlike the case of baseball and American football player Bo Jackson. As a result, in April, doctors announced a successful surgery. Jackson spoke out about Emery, speculating that they were the only two athletes to come back after the disease. Jackson added, "I take my hat off [to him]. I want him to know I am in his corner. It's a lot of hard work. To come back and play, it takes a very, very special and driven person. He's got a different makeup to want to do all the little things he needs to compete on a professional level." Unlike Jackson, who required numerous hip replacements, Emery had the benefit of advancements in modern medicine, undergoing a very specialized and complex procedure that involved removing 13 centimetres from his right fibula, and then grafting it to the femur to re-introduce a proper blood supply to the area. Holmgren said that while the surgery went better than expected, he did not know exactly how long Emery's recovery would take.

On July 1, Emery became an unrestricted free agent as his injury deemed him unable to play until he recuperated. In August, he was given the go-ahead to begin the grueling and tedious workout and rehabilitation process. In November 2010, TSN visited Emery during an on-ice workout and were surprised to see him get down into the butterfly position and play for the first time since surgery. Emery stated that he did not "care if [he could] walk in seven years", and he "just [wanted] to play". To the surprise of his doctors and trainers, Emery recovered faster than expected. In January 2011, Emery began skating with an OHL team, taking shots and training with Eric Lindros, and working with personal trainer Matt Nichol and goalie coach Eli Wilson. According to Wilson, Emery was "as sharp and ready now as he was the summer before Ottawa's Stanley Cup Final run".

In March 2011, Emery's injury and undefeated return to the NHL with the Anaheim Ducks garnered much media attention and fascination, with a special segment featured on CBC's Hockey Night in Canada. Emery had 13 centimetres of bone missing from his leg. This later garnered him a nomination for the Bill Masterton Memorial Trophy.

=== Anaheim Ducks (2011) ===
On February 7, 2011, four NHL teams showed interest in signing Emery before he signed a one-year two-way contract with the Anaheim Ducks. He was then assigned to the Syracuse Crunch to begin the standard two-week conditioning AHL stint where he went on to play a total of five games for the Crunch in their 2010–11 season, posting a 4–1–0 record, with a 1.98 GAA and a .943 save percentage. On February 23, 2011, upon completion of his conditioning stint, Emery was called up to the Ducks. Emery made his Ducks debut on March 11, 2011, to a standing ovation against the Phoenix Coyotes when he replaced goaltender Dan Ellis. Emery won six straight starts to open his Anaheim career, falling one shy of matching the Ducks' record for consecutive wins by a goaltender, held by Guy Hebert. In the week of March 14, Emery was honoured with the NHL's Second Star of the Week after going 2–0–0 with a 0.99 GAA and a .968 save percentage.

Emery led the Ducks into the playoffs, finishing tied for fourth in the league and posting a 7–2–0 record with 2.28 GAA and .926 save percentage in ten regular-season NHL appearances. In April, Emery's comeback was recognized when the Anaheim chapter of the Professional Hockey Writers' Association (PHWA) nominated Emery for the 2011 Bill Masterton Memorial Trophy. The NHL also nominated Emery for the Bill Masterton Memorial Trophy, making him one of three finalists.

=== Chicago Blackhawks (2011–2013) ===
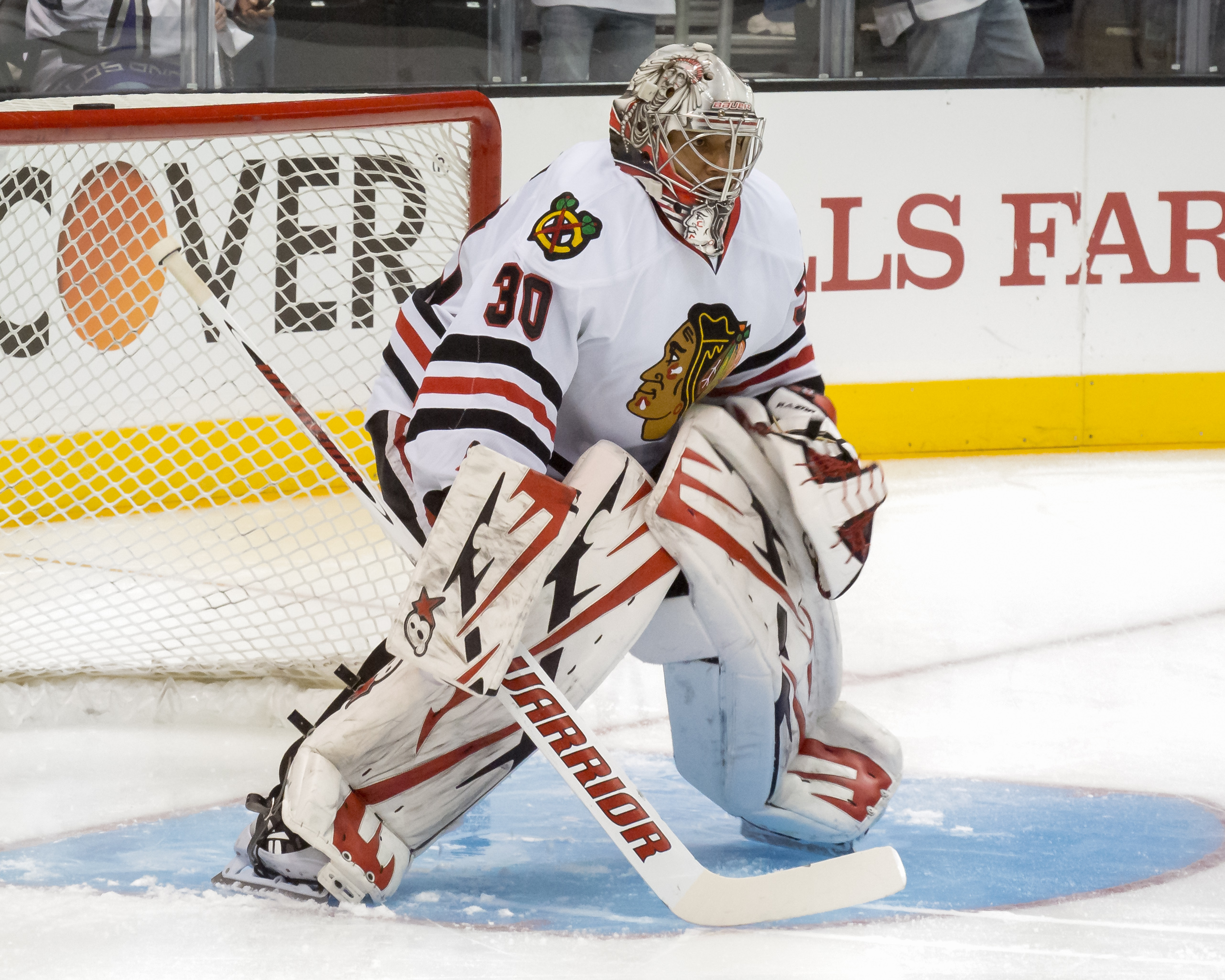
Emery with the Blackhawks in January 2013

On October 3, 2011, Emery signed a one-year contract for the 2011–12 season with the Chicago Blackhawks after a successful try-out. By the end of the season, Emery compiled a 15–9–4 record and a 2.81 GAA in 34 appearances, posting a 10–0–3 record and a 2.15 GAA in 16 appearances at Chicago's United Center. Emery was again nominated, this time by the Blackhawks, for the Bill Masterton Memorial Trophy, honouring dedication and perseverance although he didn't make the final three by the NHL. In April 2012, the Blackhawks signed Emery to a one-year extension worth $1.15 million to keep him with the team into the 2012–13 season.

Emery made NHL history in March 2013 by becoming the first goaltender to start a season with ten straight wins, going 10–0–0. He improved his NHL record to eleven straight wins against the Colorado Avalanche on March 18. Emery went to 12–0–0 in a shutout win against the Calgary Flames, in his 200th NHL start. On April 10, he made franchise history by recording his third shutout in five games, helping him to third in the NHL with a 1.90 GAA and seventh in save percentage at .924 with a 15–1–0 record. Emery proved his previous injuries were no longer a concern, posting career highs.

By the end of the lockout-shortened 2012–13 season, Emery and teammate Corey Crawford won the award for the NHL's best combined GAA, the 2013 William M. Jennings Trophy, awarded to the goaltender who gives up the fewest goals in the season and the Blackhawks were awarded the Presidents' Trophy as the regular season champions. Emery finished the season with a 1.94 GAA, a .922 save percentage, and 17 wins with only one loss. He won his first Stanley Cup when the Blackhawks defeated the Boston Bruins in the 2013 Stanley Cup Final in six games.

=== Return to Philadelphia (2013–2015) ===
On July 5, 2013, Emery signed a one-year deal with the Philadelphia Flyers worth $1.65 million. With the Flyers, Emery served as the backup to regular goaltender Steve Mason. On November 1, Emery participated in a brawl against the Capitals, fighting opposing goaltender Braden Holtby, who was uninterested in fighting. For the season, he was 9–12–2 with a 2.96 GAA in 28 appearances. On July 1, 2014, he re-signed for another year in the same role for $1 million. In 31 appearances with the Flyers in the 2014–15 season, Emery had a 10–11–7 record and a 3.06 GAA, and his save percentage was under .900.

=== 2015–2016 ===
On September 8, 2015, the Tampa Bay Lightning announced that Emery would be attending training camp on a PTO (professional tryout). During the preseason he was released from this PTO on September 27. In October and November 2015, Emery trained with the Ontario Reign of the AHL, affiliate to the Los Angeles Kings. It was announced on December 18, 2015, that Emery had signed a professional tryout agreement with the Toronto Marlies of the American Hockey League (AHL), who are affiliated with the Toronto Maple Leafs.

Emery was praised for his leadership and mentoring abilities; on January 24, 2016, upon Crawford recording his league-leading seventh shutout of the season with the Blackhawks after a win against the Blues, he credited Emery for turning around his work habits. Crawford stated that Emery's work habits led him to increase his focus and preparation before a game and during practice. "As a goalie, I've never seen a guy be so focused and ready for a game", Crawford said. "I was kind of doing the opposite – being nonchalant and doing other stuff and not having a routine. You get in that physical routine that just makes you ready mentally. You trick yourself into knowing that it's game time and time to play." Kyle Dubas, assistant GM of the Marlies, cited Emery for his mentorship towards the team.

On February 5, 2016, Emery signed with Adler Mannheim of the German elite league Deutsche Eishockey Liga for the remainder of the season, thus ending his professional tryout with the Marlies. On March 29, he signed a tryout contract with the Flyers, and on April 1, the team announced that it had signed Emery for the remainder of the season. At the end of the season, Emery retired from the NHL.

== Personal life ==
Emery was a popular fighter in the NHL because it was rare for a goaltender to fight. Emery was a boxing fan and had images of Joe Frazier, Bernard Hopkins, Sugar Ray Leonard, and Mike Tyson and the fictional Rocky Balboa on his helmets.

Emery's erratic behavior was the subject of much speculation by the press during his tenure with the Ottawa Senators. Reports concerning Emery included a road rage incident involving a senior citizen, a car accident that led to a missed flight to a road game, a fight on the street in public, lateness to practice, a stick-smashing incident during practice, fights with teammates during practice, and rumored alcohol abuse. In 2008, the media speculated that Emery was involved with a bad crowd and recreational drugs. When asked about this speculation, Emery responded, "I'm not a saint and I'm not in jail, either." At one point, Emery was asked by the team's general manager whether he had a drug problem; Emery responded in the negative. Former Senators coach John Paddock later expressed regret on how Emery was handled in Ottawa; he was partially responsible for signing Emery to the Flyers, where they worked together from 2013 to 2016.

In January 2009, a video surfaced of Emery trying to chase and punch a team trainer while the trainer was attempting to place a hat on his head in January 2009. In 2011, Emery stated that he had learned from his past mistakes and that he had undergone anger management classes as well as eight weeks of behavioural counselling.

In June 2010, Emery began dating Canadian singer Keshia Chanté, and starred as the love interest in Chanté's music video for "Test Drive". On June 16, 2016, Emery proposed to Chanté on her birthday in Nassau, Bahamas. Emery and Chanté were set to wed in June 2017; however, simultaneously with the release of her cover on Today's Bride, Chanté announced via her Instagram account that she had called off the wedding. On September 18, 2017, Chanté advised TMZ that she went to police seeking a restraining order against Emery. According to TMZ, Emery was arrested for allegedly uttering threats and assaulting her with a weapon.

=== Vehicular incidents ===
In March 2007, Emery was charged after a minor crash while heading to the airport; the accident forced him to miss a team-chartered flight to a road game. In September 2007, he had a much-publicized road rage incident with a 65-year-old man; Emery was accused of cutting off the man's vehicle on the highway and threatening to kill him. No charges were laid.

In February 2008, Ottawa police pulled Emery over. He had allegedly cut off a police cruiser with his Hummer. Police said that he was aggressive with officers. In March 2009, he was charged with stunt driving for allegedly having driven 50 km/h (31 mph) or more over the posted speed limit. Police impounded his Hummer. He appeared on TSN's Off the Record with Michael Landsberg, saying that, at the time, his Hummer had been pulled over at least 30 times.

== Death ==
On July 15, 2018, Emery went swimming with friends at the Royal Hamilton Yacht Club in Hamilton, Ontario. He jumped off a boat and friends called emergency services at approximately 6:00 am when he did not resurface. His body was found at about 2:50 pm that same day, about 18 metres (20 yd) from where he went into the water, according to Hamilton Police, who referred to the incident as a "case of misadventure". The search for Emery took longer than anticipated due to unspecified safety concerns for the dive team before they could enter the water. An autopsy indicated that Emery had drowned, and police concluded their investigation as "non-criminal".

On July 16, Keshia Chanté penned an emotional tribute to Emery, stating that she was "heartbroken" and that he was "a superhero" who was "loving, affectionate, intelligent, hilarious, giving". She also stated that they "may have had differences" but they "forgave each other and continued to love each other right to the very end."

On October 15, prior to a game against the Dallas Stars, the Senators presented a tribute for Emery. Among those present were his close friend Jason Spezza, who was a teammate in Ottawa and was playing for the Stars at the time, and Chanté, who sang the national anthems.

== Career statistics ==
=== Regular season and playoffs ===
			Regular season										Playoffs
Season	Team	League	GP	W	L	T	OTL	MIN	GA	SO	GAA	SV%	GP	W	L	MIN	GA	SO	GAA	SV%
1998–99	Dunnville Terriers	NDJCHL	22	3	19	0	—	1320	140	0	6.36	—	—	—	—	—	—	—	—	—
1999–2000	Welland Cougars	GHL	23	13	10	0	—	1323	62	1	2.81	—	—	—	—	—	—	—	—	—
1999–2000	Sault Ste. Marie Greyhounds	OHL	16	9	3	0	—	716	36	1	3.02	.908	15	8	7	883	33	3	2.24	.926
2000–01	Sault Ste. Marie Greyhounds	OHL	52	18	29	2	—	2938	174	1	3.55	.904	—	—	—	—	—	—	—	—
2001–02	Sault Ste. Marie Greyhounds	OHL	59	33	17	9	—	3477	158	4	2.73	.914	6	2	4	360	19	1	3.16	.925
2002–03	Binghamton Senators	AHL	50	27	17	6	—	2924	118	7	2.42	.924	14	8	6	848	40	2	2.83	.912
2002–03	Ottawa Senators	NHL	3	1	0	0	—	84	2	0	1.42	.923	—	—	—	—	—	—	—	—
2003–04	Binghamton Senators	AHL	53	21	23	7	—	3109	128	3	2.47	.922	2	0	2	120	6	0	3.00	.912
2003–04	Ottawa Senators	NHL	3	2	0	0	—	126	5	0	2.38	.904	—	—	—	—	—	—	—	—
2004–05	Binghamton Senators	AHL	51	28	18	5	—	2993	132	0	2.65	.910	6	2	4	409	14	0	2.05	.925
2005–06	Ottawa Senators	NHL	39	23	11	—	4	2167	102	3	2.82	.902	10	5	5	604	29	0	2.88	.900
2006–07	Ottawa Senators	NHL	58	33	16	—	6	3351	138	5	2.47	.918	20	13	7	1,249	47	3	2.26	.907
2007–08	Ottawa Senators	NHL	31	12	13	—	4	1689	88	0	3.13	.890	—	—	—	—	—	—	—	—
2007–08	Binghamton Senators	AHL	2	1	1	—	0	120	6	0	3.00	.930	—	—	—	—	—	—	—	—
2008–09	Atlant Moscow Oblast	KHL	36	22	8	—	0	2070	73	0	1.86	.926	7	3	3	419	13	0	1.86	.941
2009–10	Philadelphia Flyers	NHL	29	16	11	—	1	1684	74	3	2.64	.905	—	—	—	—	—	—	—	—
2009–10	Adirondack Phantoms	AHL	1	0	1	—	0	59	2	0	2.03	.857	—	—	—	—	—	—	—	—
2010–11	Syracuse Crunch	AHL	5	4	1	—	0	303	10	0	1.98	.943	—	—	—	—	—	—	—	—
2010–11	Anaheim Ducks	NHL	10	7	2	—	0	527	20	0	2.28	.926	6	2	3	319	17	0	3.19	.897
2011–12	Chicago Blackhawks	NHL	34	15	9	—	4	1774	83	0	2.81	.900	—	—	—	—	—	—	—	—
2012–13	Chicago Blackhawks	NHL	21	17	1	—	0	1116	36	3	1.94	.922	—	—	—	—	—	—	—	—
2013–14	Philadelphia Flyers	NHL	28	9	12	—	2	1398	69	2	2.96	.903	3	1	2	172	10	0	3.49	.888
2014–15	Philadelphia Flyers	NHL	31	10	11	—	7	1570	80	0	3.06	.894	—	—	—	—	—	—	—	—
2015–16	Ontario Reign	AHL	3	1	1	—	1	182	10	0	3.30	.878	—	—	—	—	—	—	—	—
2015–16	Toronto Marlies	AHL	3	2	1	—	0	178	8	0	2.69	.897	—	—	—	—	—	—	—	—
2015–16	Adler Mannheim	DEL	7	2	5	—	0	420	20	0	2.86	.900	1	0	0	21	3	0	8.65	.667
NHL totals			287	145	86	0	28	15,488	697	16	2.70	.906	39	21	17	2,344	103	3	2.64	.902

Statistics via Eliteprospects

== Awards ==
Award	League/Organization	Year
First All–Star Team	OHL	2002
Goaltender of the Year	OHL	2002
First All–Star Team	CHL	2002
Goaltender of the Year	CHL	2002
All–Rookie Team	AHL	2003
Goaltender of the Month (April)	AHL	2005
Molson Cup season winner	Ottawa Senators	2006–07
William M. Jennings Trophy (with Corey Crawford)	NHL	2013
Stanley Cup champion	Chicago Blackhawks	2013

== See also ==
- List of Ottawa Senators players
- List of black NHL players

Awards and achievements
Preceded by Brian Elliott, Jaroslav Halak	Winner of the William M. Jennings Trophy with Corey Crawford; 2013	Succeeded by Jonathan Quick
