= Duquesne Athletic Club =

- City: Pittsburgh, Pennsylvania
- League: Western Pennsylvania Hockey League
- Founded: 1908; 118 years ago
- Operated: 1908–1909
- Home arena: Duquesne Garden
- General manager: J. G. S. Ramsey
- Captain: Alf Smith; Horace Gaul; Harry McRobie

Championships
- Regular season titles: 1 (1908–09)

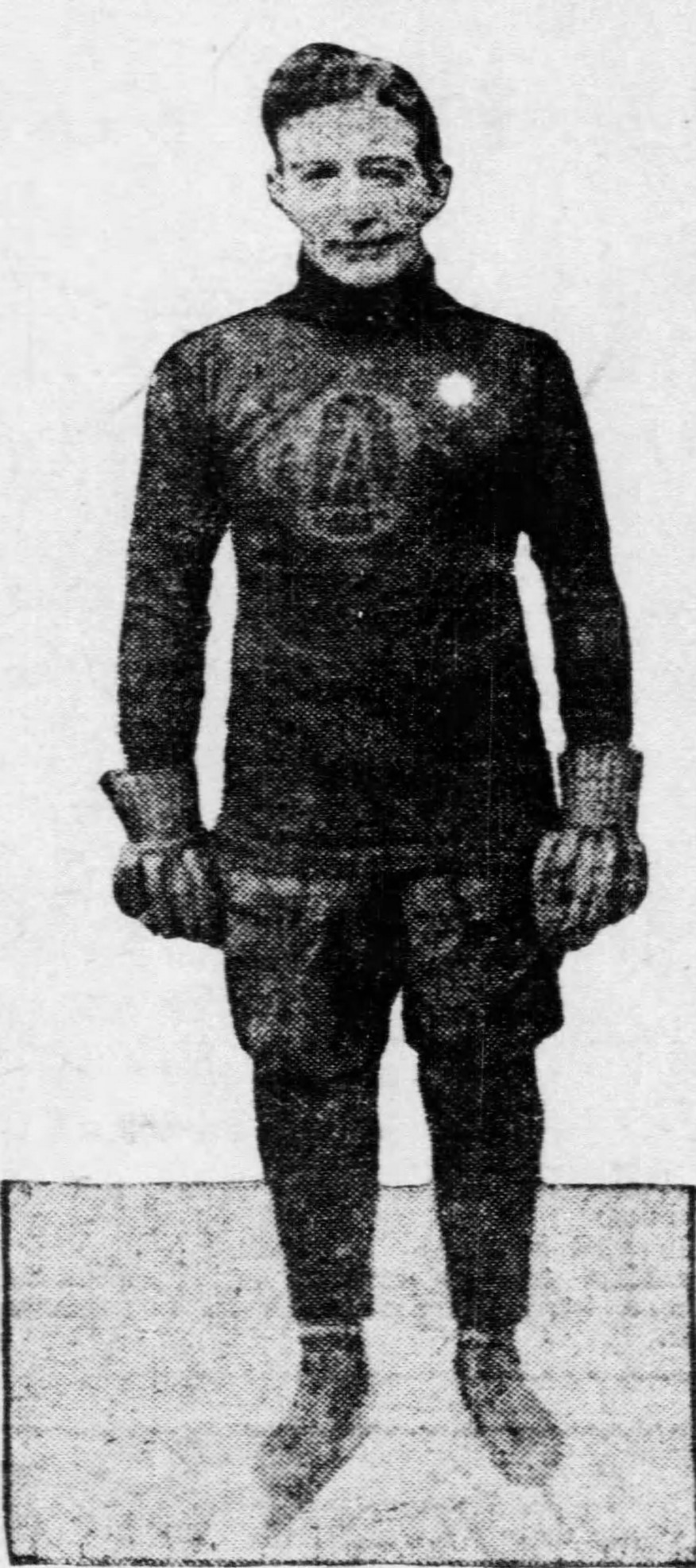
Alf Smith

The Duquesne Athletic Club professional ice hockey team, based in Pittsburgh, Pennsylvania, played for only one season in 1908–09. It won the final championship of the Western Pennsylvania Hockey League (WPHL).

== History ==
The Duquesne Athletic Club (DAC) was established in 1908 in a new building leased from steel and real estate magnate Henry Phipps. Located on Duquesne Way in downtown Pittsburgh, the building featured a swimming pool, a gymnasium and Victorian-style Turkish baths. The new club promised to support a variety of sports and teams, including a WPHL ice hockey team to be "composed of stars". The hockey team took the place in the league vacated by the defunct Pittsburgh Pirates.

The club secured Alf Smith, former Ottawa Silver Seven star who began his professional career with the Pittsburgh Athletic Club, to captain the team and choose its players. Although paying Smith well, the club failed to fulfill its agreement to find him employment outside hockey and parted ways with him early in the season.

In the DAC's only season, the last of the WPHL's existence, many players in the league "jumped" their contracts for better offers from Canadian clubs. Such desertions depleted the league's rosters and forced the mid-season disbandment of one Pittsburgh team, the Lyceum, whose remaining players were distributed to the league's three remaining teams. Among the "jumpers" to Canada was the DAC's Horace Gaul, who had earlier replaced the departing Smith as team captain. Harry McRobie, Tom Westwick, and Joe Dennison abandoned the team in early January for the St. Catharines Pros of the Ontario Professional Hockey League, but after only a few days there, reconsidered and came back to the DAC. The Duquesne team was from then on nicknamed the "Prodigals", by analogy with the biblical prodigal son leaving home and returning.

Rebounding from a poor start, the team won nine of its last ten games, including all of its last six, to finish with a 10–4–1 record and win the league title by just a half game over the Pittsburgh Bankers. The championship came down to the last game of the season, in which Duquesne beat the Bankers 4–2 on the strength of a hat trick by center Ogal Mallen (brother of Ken and Jim Mallen).

The official WPHL referee, Roy Schooley, questioned whether the "Prodigals" would have won the title had all of the teams that started the season finished intact, but praised Duquesne's performance, saying that "after the making over process they played earnestly, consistently, and at times brilliantly". Schooley gave special credit for the team's success to McRobie (who finished the season as captain), Westwick, Dennison, and Ray Robinson. He called Robinson "by far the best left wing in the league" and McRobie "head and shoulders above" the rest of the league's cover points.

References to uniform color are in reports of a game played December 19, 1908: The team was referred to in one newspaper as the "brown and white artists" and in another as the "maroon jersey wearers".
