= Horace Gaul =

Canadian ice hockey player and lacrosse player

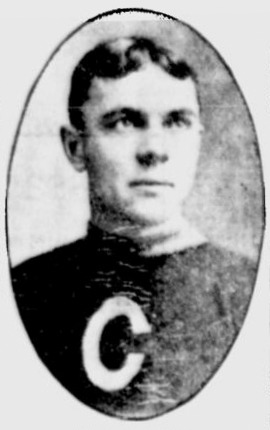
- Gaul with Capital Lacrosse Club of Ottawa
- Born: December 21, 1883 Gaspé, Quebec, Canada
- Died: July 9, 1939 (aged 55) Vancouver, British Columbia, Canada
- Height: 5 ft 9 in (175 cm)
- Weight: 160 lb (73 kg; 11 st 6 lb)
- Position: Right wing
- Shot: Right
- Played for: Ottawa Hockey Club; Pittsburgh Pros; Brooklyn SC; Brockville HC; Renfrew Creamery Kings; Haileybury Comets; Berlin Dutchmen; New Glasgow Cubs; Toronto Tecumsehs
- Playing career: 1904–1913

Horace Joseph Gaul (December 21, 1883 – July 9, 1939) was a Canadian professional ice hockey and lacrosse player who played from 1904 until 1913 most notably with the Pittsburgh Professionals, Haileybury Comets, Ottawa Senators and Toronto Tecumsehs. As a lacrosse player he was a member of the Ottawa Capital Lacrosse Club.

== Playing career ==
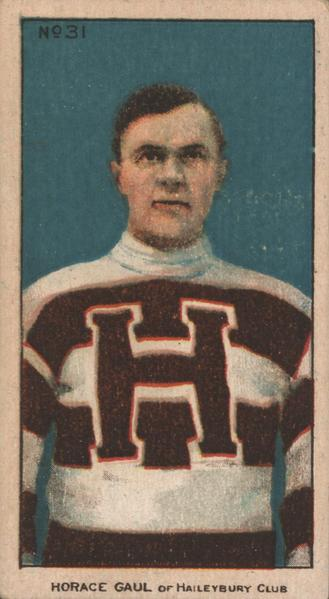
Gaul with Haileybury

Born in Gaspé, Quebec, Canada, the Gaul family later moved to Ottawa, Ontario. Horace first played senior amateur hockey for the Ottawa Silver Seven in 1904–05, as a member of the Stanley Cup winning squad. In 1906, he became professional, joining Pittsburgh of the International Hockey League. In 1907, he returned to Canada, playing for Brockville and Renfrew senior teams.

In 1908–09, Gaul split his time with Duquesne Athletic Club (of Pittsburgh) and Haileybury of the Timiskaming Professional Hockey League. He stayed with Haileybury for the inaugural National Hockey Association (NHA) 1910 season. When the team folded the next year, he returned to play for Ottawa and won a second Stanley Cup in 1911.

In 1911, Gaul joined New Glasgow of the Maritime Professional Hockey League (MPHL). He played his final season in 1912–13 for the new Toronto Tecumsehs of the NHA.
