= Thomas Westwick =

Canadian ice hockey player

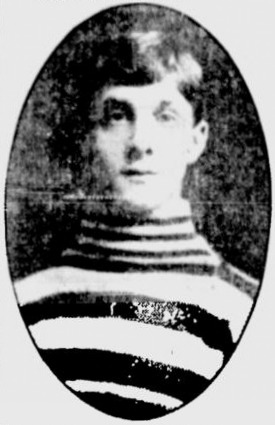
- Westwick prior to 1907.
- Born: June 28, 1887 Ottawa, Ontario, Canada
- Died: December 15, 1963 (aged 76) Ottawa, Ontario, Canada
- Position: Right wing
- Played for: Ottawa Senators; Quebec Bulldogs; Duquesne Athletic Club (WPHL)
- Playing career: early 1900s–1914

Thomas Frederick Westwick (June 28, 1887 – December 15, 1963) was a Canadian professional ice hockey player. He played five professional seasons for the Ottawa Senators and the Quebec Bulldogs from 1909 until 1916. His brother Harry was also a professional ice hockey player.

== Playing career ==
Born in Ottawa, Ontario, Westwick first played senior-level hockey with the Ottawa Hockey Club in 1906–07, although he only started in one game. In 1907–08, he played for the Ottawa Emmetts of the Ottawa City Hockey League. The following season he turned professional, playing for the Duquesne Athletic Club of the Western Pennsylvania Hockey League (WPHL). He was out of professional hockey until 1912–13 when he returned to Ottawa to play for the Senators. He switched to the Bulldogs for the 1913–14 season and played two seasons with Quebec before retiring. He died on December 15, 1963.
