= Joe Dennison =

Canadian ice hockey player

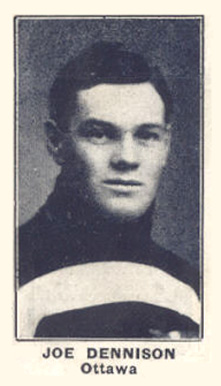
- Born: February 2, 1888; Ottawa, Ontario, Canada
- Died: September 21, 1958 (aged 70); Ottawa, Ontario, Canada
- Height: 5 ft 8 in (173 cm)
- Weight: 156 lb (71 kg; 11 st 2 lb)
- Position: Centre
- Shot: Right
- Played for: Ottawa Senators
- Playing career: 1907–1913

Joseph Charles Dennison (February 2, 1888 – September 21, 1958) was a Canadian professional ice hockey player. Born in Ottawa, Ontario, Dennison played his first professional season of 1908–09 mostly with the Duquesne Athletic Club of the Western Pennsylvania Hockey League. In 1911, he signed with the Ottawa Senators of the National Hockey Association. He appeared in 14 games for the Senators during the span of the 1911–12 and 1912–13 seasons. Later, he worked for the Bell Telephone Company, retiring in 1945 due to his health. He died at his home in Ottawa in 1958 of heart disease.
