= Greg George =

Canadian ice hockey player

- Born: May 9, 1888 Eganville, Ontario, Canada
- Died: February 2, 1942 (aged 53)
- Height: 5 ft 9 in (175 cm)
- Weight: 190 lb (86 kg; 13 st 8 lb)
- Position: Centre
- Shot: Left
- Played for: Queen's University Golden Gaels; Ottawa New Edinburghs; Ottawa Senators; Montreal Wanderers
- Playing career: 1907–1917

Gregory Angus George (May 9, 1888 – February 2, 1942) was a Canadian professional ice hockey player from Eganville, Ontario. He played with the Ottawa Senators and the Montreal Wanderers of the National Hockey Association in 1913–14 and 1916–17.
