= Arthur Sixsmith =

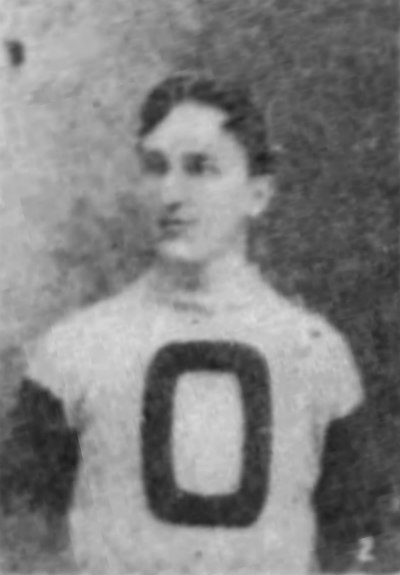
- Sixsmith with Ottawa HC in 1900–01.
- Born: June 27, 1880 Ottawa, Ontario, Canada
- Died: March 15, 1969 (aged 88) Titusville, Florida, U.S.
- Position: Rover
- Played for: Pittsburgh Keystones; Pittsburgh Professionals; Pittsburgh Bankers; Ottawa Senators
- Playing career: 1901–1909

Arthur Egerton Sixsmith (June 27, 1880 – March 15, 1969) was a Canadian professional ice hockey rover and businessman. He played for the Ottawa Hockey Club and later moved to Pittsburgh to play professionally. He was a member of the Ottawa's 1901 CAHL championship team. As one of the first professional ice hockey players, he captained and managed several of the championship teams in the Western Pennsylvania Hockey League (WPHL). His brother, Garnet Sixsmith, also played professionally in Pittsburgh.

== Career ==
Born in Ottawa, Ontario, Sixsmith first played senior hockey at the age of 15 with the Ottawa Cliffsides of the Ottawa City Hockey League. He played junior hockey until 1899 when he joined the Ottawa Hockey Club, playing two seasons for the club, scoring seven goals in nine games. During his time with the club, Ottawa won two CAHL titles.

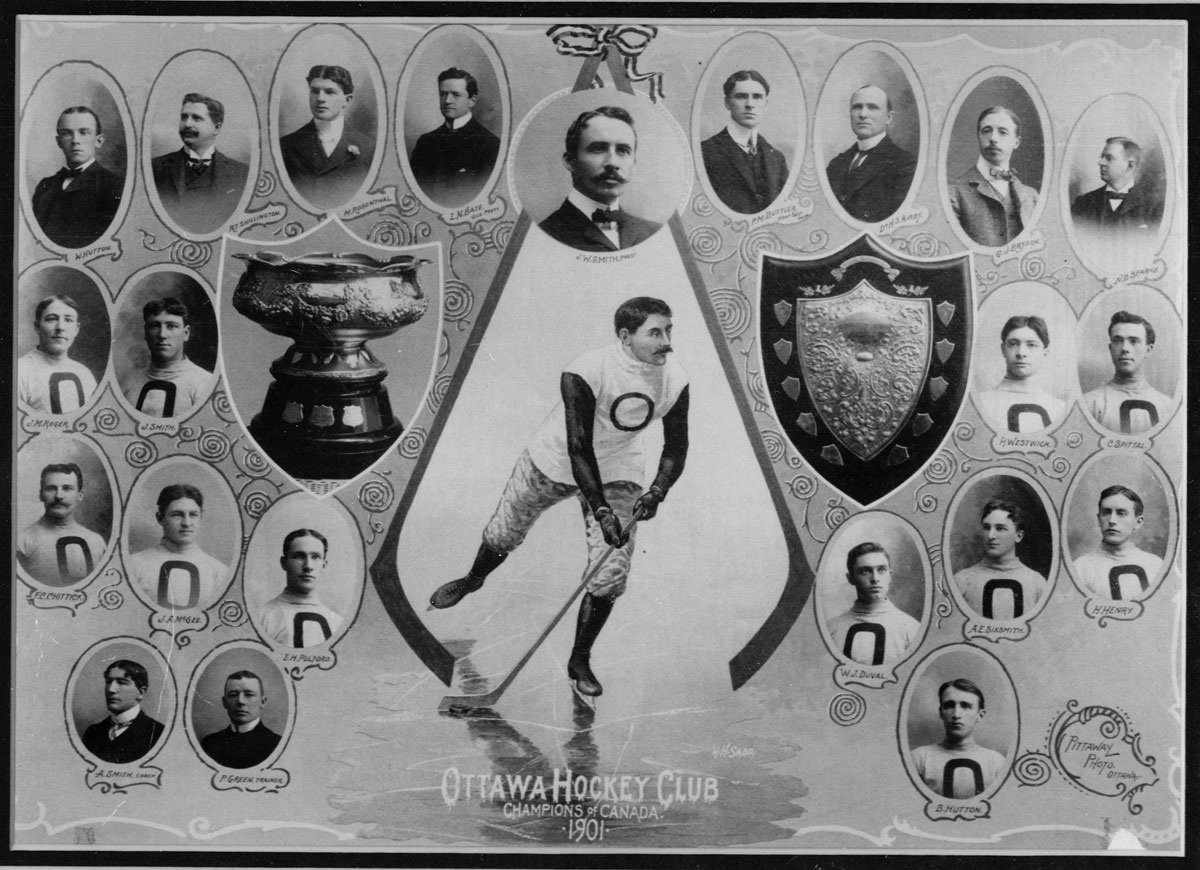
Arthur Sixsmith, second from right in the second row from the bottom, with the Ottawa Hockey Club in 1901.

In 1901, Art visited Pittsburgh on his way back to Ottawa from his wedding in Campbellton, New Brunswick. In Pittsburgh, he met Arthur McSwigan and the two men founded the WPHL. By 1902, Art convinced his brother, Garnet, and several other Canadian players to play in the new league.

He then turned professional with the WPHL's Pittsburgh Keystones, for which he played with for the next three seasons. During this time, he also served as the team's manager and won a WPHL title with the club in 1902. In 1903, became the captain and manager of the Pittsburgh Victorias. However, in 1905, the WPHL teams were consolidated into the Pittsburgh Professionals of the International Professional Hockey League (IPHL). Art then served as the captain of the Professionals for the next two seasons. When the WPHL was revived in 1907, Art played with the Pittsburgh Bankers for two further seasons. In 1915, Art became the manager of the Pittsburgh Winter Garden hockey team. The team was based at the Pittsburgh Winter Garden and featured his brother, Garnet. However, the team only lasted one season, before disbanding in 1916.

Following his hockey career, he went into the banking industry working his way up the corporate ladder in Mellon Banking to become Andrew W. Mellon's personal assistant. He held this position during Mr. Mellon's tenure working for U.S. Presidents: Herbert Hoover, Calvin Coolidge and Warren G. Harding. During this time he amassed a personal fortune of over ten million dollars only to lose it in the stock market crash of 1929. He retired to Florida, later lived with a son in Cheyenne, Wyoming and died in Titusville, Florida in 1969. He is buried in an unmarked grave at Pittsburgh's Homewood Cemetery.

== Statistics ==
Exh. = Exhibition games

			Regular season					Playoffs
Season	Team	League	GP	G	A	Pts	PIM	GP	G	A	Pts	PIM
1900	Ottawa Hockey Club	CAHL	1	0	–	0	–	–	–	–	–	–
1901	Ottawa Hockey Club	CAHL	7	7	–	7	–	–	–	–	–	–
1901–02	Pittsburgh Keystones	Exh.	7	13	6	19	2	–	–	–	–	–
1901–02	Pittsburgh Keystones	WPHL	13	12	2	14	15	–	–	–	–	–
1902–03	Pittsburgh Victorias	WPHL	11	7	3	10	5	–	–	–	–	–
1903–04	Pittsburgh Victorias	WPHL	13	16	8	24	9	–	–	–	–	–
	Pittsburgh Victorias	US Pro	–	–	–	–	–	5	5	3	8	6
1904–05	Pittsburgh Professionals	IPHL	11	16	0	16	2	–	–	–	–	–
1905–06	Pittsburgh Professionals	IPHL	18	23	0	23	30	–	–	–	–	–
1906–07	–	–	–	–	–	–		–	–	–	–	–
1907–08	Pittsburgh Bankers	WPHL	19	8	–	8	–	–	–	–	–	–
	Pittsburgh Bankers	World Pro	–	–	–	–	–	3	2	–	2	–
1908–09	Pittsburgh Bankers	WPHL	15	17	–	17	–	–	–	–	–	–
WPHL totals			71	60	13	73	29	–	–	–	–	–
IPHL totals			29	39	0	39	32	–	–	–	–	–

Statistics per Society for International Hockey Research at sihrhockey.org
