= 1902–03 Yale Bulldogs men's ice hockey season =

College ice hockey season

- Conference: 2nd IHA

Record
- Overall: 4–12–1
- Conference: 4–4–0
- Road: 2–6–0
- Neutral: 2–6–1

Coaches and captains
- Captain: Charles Hitchcock Jr.

The 1902–03 Yale Bulldogs men's ice hockey season was the eighth season of play for the program.

== Season ==
For the first time in five seasons, Yale was not the intercollegiate champion. A majority of Yale's games were played at the St. Nicholas Rink as it was one of the few available locations where consistent ice could be secured.

The team did not have a coach, however, Reeve Schley served as team manager.

== Roster ==
No.	Nat.	Player	Class	Pos	Height	Weight	DoB	Hometown	Previous team
		John Dilworth	Sophomore	F
		Charles Hitchcock Jr. (C)	Senior	D
		Bill Marcus	Freshman	F
		George Mohlman	Junior	F
		Augustus Oliver	Senior	F
		Erling Ostby	Senior	F			1880-10-13
		Henry Potter	Senior	F
		Rufus Rowland	Freshman	F
		Henry Stern	Senior	G
		Samuel Van der Poel	Senior	F
	(United States)	G. B. Ward	Graduate	D			1878-11-06	Bristol, Connecticut

== Standings ==
1902–03 Collegiate ice hockey standings
	Intercollegiate							Overall					
	GP	W	L	T	PCT.	GF	GA	GP	W	L	T	GF	GA
Brown	4	0	4	0	.000	2	20	6	1	5	0	9	23
Columbia	5	1	3	1	.300	15	17	9	3	5	1	21	28
Cornell	2	1	1	0	.500	4	2	2	1	1	0	4	2
Harvard	7	7	0	0	1.000	33	8	10	10	0	0	51	14
MIT	1	0	1	0	.000	3	4	1	0	1	0	3	4
Princeton	5	2	2	1	.500	14	12	11	5	5	1	44	40
Rensselaer	1	0	1	0	.000	1	2	1	0	1	0	1	2
Williams	1	1	0	0	1.000	2	1	3	2	1	0	9	11
Yale	8	4	4	0	.500	17	24	17	4	12	1	30	83

1902–03 Intercollegiate Hockey Association standings
	Conference								Overall					
	GP	W	L	T	PTS	GF	GA		GP	W	L	T	GF	GA
Harvard *	4	4	0	0	8	18	2		10	10	0	0	51	14
Yale	4	2	2	0	4	11	8		17	4	12	1	30	83
Columbia	4	2	2	0	4	12	14	†	9	3	5	1	21	28
Princeton	4	2	2	0	4	14	8	†	11	5	5	1	44	40
Brown	4	0	4	0	0	2	20		6	1	5	0	9	23
* indicates conference champion † Princeton's team disbanded before a tie with Columbia could be settled and was forced to forfeit the game.

== Schedule and results ==
Date	Opponent	Site	Result	Record
Regular season
December 16	at New York Hockey Club*	St. Nicholas Rink • New York, New York	L 1–2	0–1–0
December 31	at Pittsburgh Keystones*	Duquesne Garden • Pittsburgh, Pennsylvania	L 3–8	0–2–0
January 1	at Pittsburgh Bankers*	Duquesne Garden • Pittsburgh, Pennsylvania	L 0–6	0–3–0
January 2	at Pittsburgh Victorias*	Duquesne Garden • Pittsburgh, Pennsylvania	L 2–8	0–4–0
January 3	at Pittsburgh Athletic Club*	Duquesne Garden • Pittsburgh, Pennsylvania	L 1–7	0–5–0
January 9	vs. Brooklyn Crescents*	St. Nicholas Rink • New York, New York	L 0–14	0–6–0
January 14	at Columbia	St. Nicholas Rink • New York, New York	W 6–4	1–6–0 (1–0–0)
January 16	at Pittsfield Athletic Club*	Pittsfield, Massachusetts	L 3–6	1–7–0
January 21	vs. Cornell*	St. Nicholas Rink • New York, New York	W 2–0	2–7–0
January 23	vs. Brown	St. Nicholas Rink • New York, New York	W 2–0	3–7–0 (2–0–0)
January 24	vs. Short Hills*	St. Nicholas Rink • New York, New York	T 1–1 ^{OT}	3–7–1
February 7	vs. Princeton	St. Nicholas Rink • New York, New York	L 1–4	3–8–1 (2–1–0)
February 17	vs. Queen's*	St. Nicholas Rink • New York, New York	L 2–7	3–9–1
February 21	vs. Harvard	St. Nicholas Rink • New York, New York (Rivalry)	L 0–3	3–10–1 (2–2–0)
February 24	at Columbia*	St. Nicholas Rink • New York, New York (IHA Tiebreaker)	W 3–2	4–10–1
February 27	vs. Harvard*	St. Nicholas Rink • New York, New York (IHA Championship Game 1, Rivalry)	L 2–6	4–11–1
February 28	vs. Harvard*	St. Nicholas Rink • New York, New York (IHA Championship Game 2, Rivalry)	L 1–5	4–12–1
*Non-conference game.
