= William Duval (ice hockey) =

Canadian ice hockey player

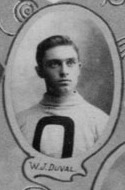
- Duval with the Ottawa Hockey Club in 1901.
- Born: August 3, 1877 Ottawa, Ontario, Canada
- Died: June 7, 1905 (aged 27) Pittsburgh, Pennsylvania, United States
- Position: Cover point
- Played for: Ottawa Aberdeens; Ottawa Atlantic Railway; Ottawa Hockey Club; Pittsburgh Victorias; Pittsburgh Professionals
- Playing career: 1899–1905

William James "Peg" Duval (August 3, 1877 – June 7, 1905) was a Canadian professional ice hockey defenceman who played for the Ottawa Hockey Club and the Pittsburgh Victorias in the late 1890s and early 1900s. He was a member of the Canadian champion 1901 Ottawa team and captain of the Ottawa team for the 1902 season. He was one of the first professional players in ice hockey.

== Playing career ==
Born in Ottawa, Ontario, Canada, Duval played intermediate hockey for the Ottawa Aberdeens and Ottawa Atlantic Railway teams before joining the Ottawa Hockey Club in the 1899–1900 season. He played two further seasons for Ottawa, and was named captain prior to the 1902 season. In February 1903, his teammate Rat Westwick married Duval's sister Ruby.

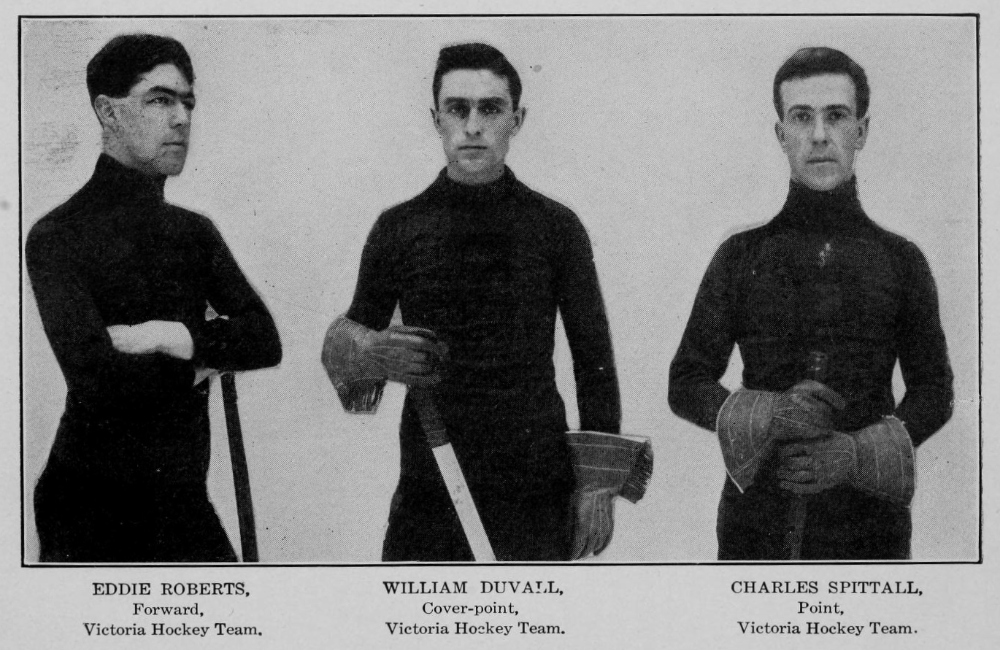
Duval, in the middle, with the Pittsburgh Victorias.

Duval moved to Pittsburgh to play professional ice hockey with the Pittsburgh Victorias of the Western Pennsylvania Hockey League (WPHL) in 1902–03. After two seasons with the Victorias, Duval joined the Pittsburgh Pros of the International Professional Hockey League for 1904–05.

Duval died due to alcoholism on June 7, 1905. Duval had been acting in an unusual manner in the weeks previous, and had been drinking heavily. The reason for the heavy drinking was not fully disclosed publicly, however, a letter arrived at his boarding house after his death from his sister, advising Duval that the "girl and the baby were doing well and that he should not be downcast." Duval had been suspended in December 1904 without pay by the Pros team for not being in condition to play although he returned to the team in time to score the winning goal in a game against Hod Stuart's Calumet team on January 7, 1905. He was released by the team in February 1905 for being unable to stay in condition to play. A Pittsburg Press newspaper report at that time said that "'Peggy' when in condition can hold his end up with any of them, but the wine when it is red seems to have a fascination for him, hence his downfall." At the time of death, Duval was working for the Pennsylvania Railroad. Duval had previously worked for the Canada Atlantic Railway in Ottawa.

== Statistics ==
| | | | Regular season | | | | | Playoffs |
| Season | Team | League | GP | G | A | Pts | PIM | GP | G | A | Pts | PIM |
|---|---|---|---|---|---|---|---|---|---|---|---|---|
| 1899-1900 | Ottawa Hockey Club | CAHL | 5 | 2 | – | 2 | – | – | – | – | – | – |
| 1900-01 | Ottawa Hockey Club | CAHL | 8 | 0 | – | 0 | – | – | – | – | – | – |
| 1901-02 | Ottawa Hockey Club | CAHL | 5 | 2 | – | 2 | – | – | – | – | – | – |
| 1902–03 | Pittsburgh Victorias | WPHL | 13 | 2 | 2 | 4 | 8 | – | – | – | – | – |
| 1903–04 | Pittsburgh Victorias | WPHL | 10 | 1 | 3 | 4 | 0 | – | – | – | – | – |
| | Pittsburgh Victorias | US Pro | – | – | – | – | – | 6 | 0 | 1 | 1 | 3 |
| 1904–05 | Pittsburgh Professionals | IPHL | 13 | 4 | 0 | 4 | 6 | – | – | – | – | – |
| CAHL totals | | | 18 | 4 | – | 4 | – | – | – | – | – | – |
| WPHL totals | | | 23 | 3 | 5 | 8 | 8 | – | – | – | – | – |

Statistics per Society for International Hockey Research at sihrhockey.org

| Preceded by Harvey Pulford | Ottawa Senators captain (Original Era); 1902 | Succeeded by Harvey Pulford |
