= 1901–02 Yale Bulldogs men's ice hockey season =

College ice hockey season

Intercollegiate Champion Intercollegiate Hockey Association, Champion
- Conference: 1st IHA

Record
- Overall: 11–5–1
- Conference: 4–0–0
- Road: 4–4–0
- Neutral: 7–1–1

Coaches and captains
- Captain: Henry Stoddard

The 1901–02 Yale Bulldogs men's ice hockey season was the seventh season of play for the program.

== Season ==
For the fourth consecutive season Yale was the Intercollegiate Hockey Association champion. They finished undefeated in league play and defeated Harvard in the championship series.

The team did not have a coach, however, C.H. Baxter served as team manager.

== Roster ==
No.	Nat.	Player	Class	Pos	Height	Weight	DoB	Hometown	Previous team
		Charles Hitchcock Jr.	Junior	D
		Fred Inman	Senior	F
		Erling C. Ostby	Junior	F			1880-10-13
		Henry Potter	Junior	F
		Norman Snow	Senior	F
		Henry Stern	Junior	G
		Henry Stoddard (C)	Senior	F
	(United States)	G. B. Ward	Senior	D			1878-11-06	Bristol, Connecticut

== Standings ==
1901–02 Collegiate ice hockey standings
	Intercollegiate							Overall					
	GP	W	L	T	PCT.	GF	GA	GP	W	L	T	GF	GA
Brown	5	2	3	0	.400	13	25	6	2	4	0	14	32
Columbia	4	0	4	0	.000	10	23	8	2	4	2	22	30
Cornell	1	0	1	0	.000	0	5	1	0	1	0	0	5
Harvard	6	3	3	0	.500	24	20	10	7	3	0	46	29
MIT	1	0	1	0	.000	0	5	6	3	2	1	15	14
Princeton	4	2	2	0	.500	11	14	9	5	3	1	29	22
Rensselaer	1	0	1	0	.000	1	4	1	0	1	0	1	4
Yale	7	7	0	0	1.000	45	10	17	11	5	1	75	47

1901–02 Intercollegiate Hockey Association standings
	Conference							Overall					
	GP	W	L	T	PTS	GF	GA	GP	W	L	T	GF	GA
Yale *	4	4	0	0	8	31	6	17	11	5	1	75	47
Harvard	4	3	1	0	6	20	11	10	7	3	0	46	29
Princeton	4	2	2	0	4	11	14	9	5	3	1	29	22
Brown	4	1	3	0	2	8	25	6	2	4	0	14	32
Columbia	4	0	4	0	0	10	23	8	2	4	2	22	30
* indicates conference champion

== Schedule and results ==
Date	Opponent	Site	Result	Record
Regular season
December 5	at St. Nicholas Hockey Club*	St. Nicholas Rink • New York, New York	W 4–2	1–0–0
December 14	at New York Athletic Club*	St. Nicholas Rink • New York, New York	L 1–4	1–1–0
January 2	at Pittsburgh Athletic Club*	Duquesne Garden • Pittsburgh, Pennsylvania	L 2–5	1–2–0
January 3	at Pittsburgh Keystones*	Duquesne Garden • Pittsburgh, Pennsylvania	L 2–6	1–3–0
January 4	at All-Scholastic Team (Pennsylvania)*	Duquesne Garden • Pittsburgh, Pennsylvania	W 2–0	2–3–0
January 4	at Pittsburgh Bankers*	Duquesne Garden • Pittsburgh, Pennsylvania	L 2–3	2–4–0
January 15	vs. Princeton	St. Nicholas Rink • New York, New York	W 7–0	3–4–0 (1–0–0)
January 25	vs. Brown	St. Nicholas Rink • New York, New York	W 11–1	4–4–0 (2–0–0)
January 29	vs. Yale Alumni*	St. Nicholas Rink • New York, New York (Exhibition)	W 4–3	
February 7	vs. Brooklyn Crescents*	Clermont Avenue Skating Rink • Brooklyn, New York	L 2–9	4–5–0
February 8	at Short Hills*	Short Hills, New Jersey	W 4–2	5–5–0
February 15	vs. Harvard	St. Nicholas Rink • New York, New York (Rivalry)	W 4–3	6–5–0 (3–0–0)
February 22	vs. Cornell*	St. Nicholas Rink • New York, New York	W 5–0	7–5–0
February 28	vs. Short Hills*	Short Hills, New Jersey	T 4–4 ^{OT}	7–5–1
March 6	at Columbia	St. Nicholas Rink • New York, New York	W 9–2	8–5–1 (4–0–0)
March 7	vs. Heffley School*	Clermont Avenue Skating Rink • Brooklyn, New York	W 7–2	9–5–1
March 14	vs. Harvard*	St. Nicholas Rink • New York, New York (IHA Championship Game 1, Rivalry)	W 5–3	10–5–1
March 17	vs. Harvard*	St. Nicholas Rink • New York, New York (IHA Championship Game 2, Rivalry)	W 4–1	11–5–1
*Non-conference game.
