= 1902–03 Princeton Tigers men's ice hockey season =

College ice hockey season

- Conference: T–2nd IHA

Record
- Overall: 5–5–1
- Conference: 2–2–0
- Road: 1–3–1
- Neutral: 4–2–0

Coaches and captains
- Head coach: Gus Hornfeck
- Captain: Lyttleton Purnell

The 1902–03 Princeton Tigers men's ice hockey season was the 4th season of play for the program.

== Season ==
Towards the end of their season the Tigers played their first game outside of the United States when they traveled to play Queen's University. However, shortly after the game the Faculty Athletic Committee ordered that the team be disbanded. This caused Princeton to forfeit the tie against Columbia, which was to be played off after the game against Queens, and finish in a 3-way tie for second.

== Roster ==
No.	Nat.	Player	Class	Pos	Height	Weight	DoB	Hometown	Previous team
		Alfred King	Sophomore	G
		Edward Larned	Freshman	F
		Robert Leake	Junior	F
		Henry Lloyd	Sophomore	F
		Stephen McClave	Senior	D
		Alvar O'Brien	Freshman	F
		George Patton	Freshman	F
	(United States)	Lyttleton Purnell (C)	Junior	F			1880-11-15	Baltimore, Maryland
		Ewing Rafferty	Freshman	D
		John Rulon-Miller	Sophomore	F
		Alexander Speer	Senior	D

== Standings ==
1902–03 Collegiate ice hockey standings
	Intercollegiate							Overall					
	GP	W	L	T	PCT.	GF	GA	GP	W	L	T	GF	GA
Brown	4	0	4	0	.000	2	20	6	1	5	0	9	23
Columbia	5	1	3	1	.300	15	17	9	3	5	1	21	28
Cornell	2	1	1	0	.500	4	2	2	1	1	0	4	2
Harvard	7	7	0	0	1.000	33	8	10	10	0	0	51	14
MIT	1	0	1	0	.000	3	4	1	0	1	0	3	4
Princeton	5	2	2	1	.500	14	12	11	5	5	1	44	40
Rensselaer	1	0	1	0	.000	1	2	1	0	1	0	1	2
Williams	1	1	0	0	1.000	2	1	3	2	1	0	9	11
Yale	8	4	4	0	.500	17	24	17	4	12	1	30	83

1902–03 Intercollegiate Hockey Association standings
	Conference								Overall					
	GP	W	L	T	PTS	GF	GA		GP	W	L	T	GF	GA
Harvard *	4	4	0	0	8	18	2		10	10	0	0	51	14
Yale	4	2	2	0	4	11	8		17	4	12	1	30	83
Columbia	4	2	2	0	4	12	14	†	9	3	5	1	21	28
Princeton	4	2	2	0	4	14	8	†	11	5	5	1	44	40
Brown	4	0	4	0	0	2	20		6	1	5	0	9	23
* indicates conference champion † Princeton's team disbanded before a tie with Columbia could be settled and was forced to forfeit the game.

== Schedule and results ==
Date	Opponent	Site	Result	Record
Regular Season
December 20	at St. Nicholas Hockey Club*	St. Nicholas Rink • New York, New York	W 4–1	1–0–0
December 26	at Pittsburgh Keystones*	Duquesne Garden • Pittsburgh, Pennsylvania	L 0–5	1–1–0
December 27	at Pittsburgh All-Scholastic Team*	Duquesne Garden • Pittsburgh, Pennsylvania	W 1–0	2–1–0
December 27	at Pittsburgh Victorias*	Duquesne Garden • Pittsburgh, Pennsylvania	L 2–9	2–2–0
January 10	vs. Brown	St. Nicholas Rink • New York, New York	W 7–1	3–2–0 (1–0–0)
January 17	vs. Harvard	St. Nicholas Rink • New York, New York	L 1–4	3–3–0 (1–1–0)
January 20	vs. Cornell*	St. Nicholas Rink • New York, New York	L 0–4	3–4–0
February 5	vs. General Electric Team	Albany, New York	W 16–6	4–4–0
February 6	vs. All-Collegiate Team	Albany, New York	W 7–1	5–4–0
February 7	vs. Yale	St. Nicholas Rink • New York, New York	W 4–1	6–4–0 (2–1–0)
February 11	at Columbia	St. Nicholas Rink • New York, New York	T 2–2 †	6–4–1 (2–2–0)
February 18	vs. Queen's*	St. Nicholas Rink • New York, New York	L 0–11	6–5–1
*Non-conference game.

† Because Princeton's team was disbanded they were forced to forfeit the overtime session to be played after the 18th of February.
