= Harry Peel =

Harry Peel may refer to:

- Harry Peel (footballer) (1900–1976), English footballer
- Harry Peel (ice hockey) (1879–1944), ice hockey player

== See also ==
- Harry Piel (1892–1963), German actor, director, screenwriter, and producer
