= Exposition Hall =

Exposition Hall may refer to:

- St. Louis Exposition and Music Hall
- Winter Garden at Exposition Hall
