= 1901–02 Columbia men's ice hockey season =

- Conference: 5th IHA
- Home ice: St. Nicholas Rink

Record
- Overall: 2–4–2
- Conference: 0–4–0
- Home: 0–4–0
- Road: 1–0–1
- Neutral: 1–0–1

Coaches and captains
- Captain: Arthur Wolff

The 1901–02 Columbia men's ice hockey season was the 6th season of play for the program.

== Season ==
The team did not have a coach, however, William Shoemaker served as team manager.

Note: Columbia University adopted the Lion as its mascot in 1910.

== Roster ==
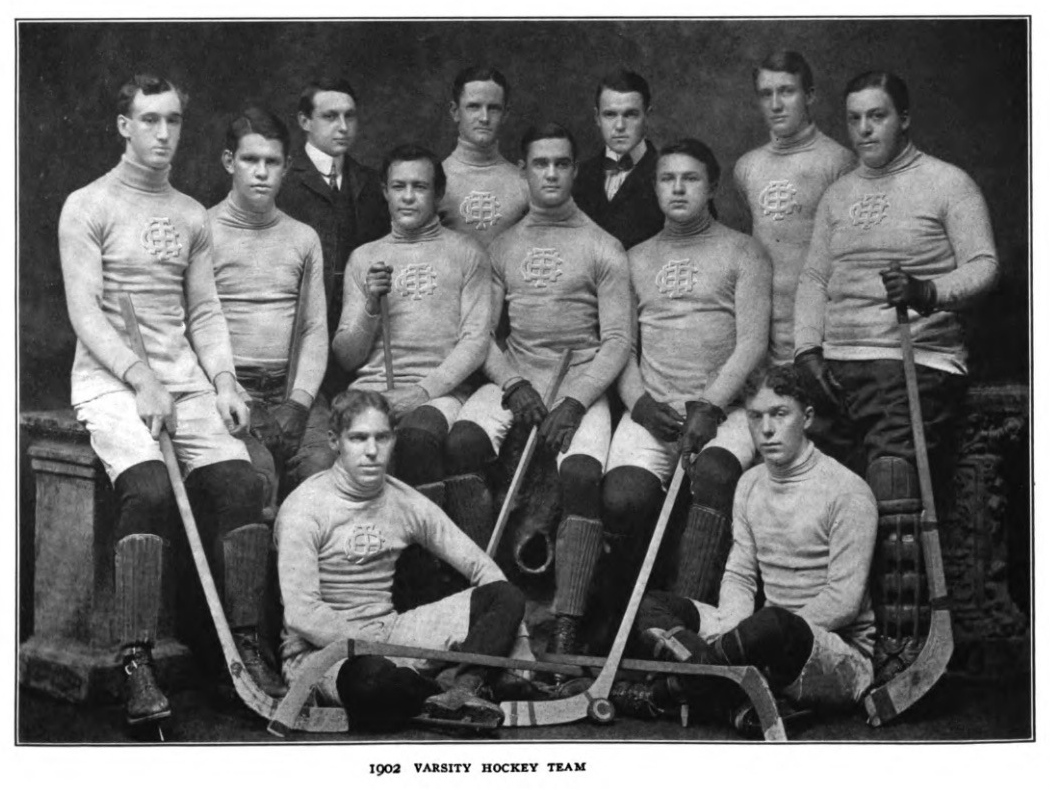
Varsity ice hockey team

No.	Nat.	Player	Class	Pos	Height	Weight	DoB	Hometown	Previous team
		Albert J. Akin	Sophomore	LW
		John Bates	Sophomore
		Farrand Benedict	Sophomore	D
		George Bradley	Freshman	LW
		Shiras Campbell	Sophomore	RW
		Charles Dana		RW
		Harold Herman Duden	Graduate	D
		William Duden	Sophomore	C
		Douglas McKee	Sophomore
		William Nichols	Sophomore
		Eugene Reid	Sophomore
		Walter L. Stern		G
	(United States)	Rudolph L. von Bernuth	Sophomore				1883-12-18	New York, New York
		Arthur Wolff	Junior	C

== Standings ==
1901–02 Collegiate ice hockey standings
	Intercollegiate							Overall					
	GP	W	L	T	PCT.	GF	GA	GP	W	L	T	GF	GA
Brown	5	2	3	0	.400	13	25	6	2	4	0	14	32
Columbia	4	0	4	0	.000	10	23	8	2	4	2	22	30
Cornell	1	0	1	0	.000	0	5	1	0	1	0	0	5
Harvard	6	3	3	0	.500	24	20	10	7	3	0	46	29
MIT	1	0	1	0	.000	0	5	6	3	2	1	15	14
Princeton	4	2	2	0	.500	11	14	9	5	3	1	29	22
Rensselaer	1	0	1	0	.000	1	4	1	0	1	0	1	4
Yale	7	7	0	0	1.000	45	10	17	11	5	1	75	47

1901–02 Intercollegiate Hockey Association standings
	Conference							Overall					
	GP	W	L	T	PTS	GF	GA	GP	W	L	T	GF	GA
Yale *	4	4	0	0	8	31	6	17	11	5	1	75	47
Harvard	4	3	1	0	6	20	11	10	7	3	0	46	29
Princeton	4	2	2	0	4	11	14	9	5	3	1	29	22
Brown	4	1	3	0	2	8	25	6	2	4	0	14	32
Columbia	4	0	4	0	0	10	23	8	2	4	2	22	30
* indicates conference champion

== Schedule and results ==
Date	Opponent	Site	Result	Record
Regular Season
	vs. St. Nicholas Hockey Club*	St. Nicholas Rink • New York, New York	T 2–2	0–0–1
January 18	Harvard	St. Nicholas Rink • New York, New York	L 3–4	0–1–1 (0–1–0)
February 6	Princeton	St. Nicholas Rink • New York, New York	L 1–5	0–2–1 (0–2–0)
February 15	at Cold Spring Athletic Club*	Cold Spring, New York	T 1–1	0–2–2
February 19	at Brooklyn Skating Club*	Clermont Avenue Skating Rink • Brooklyn, New York	W 5–3	1–2–2
February 25	Brown	St. Nicholas Rink • New York, New York	L 4–5	1–3–2 (0–3–0)
March 6	Yale	St. Nicholas Rink • New York, New York	L 2–9	1–4–2 (0–4–0)
March 12	vs. St. Nicholas Junior Team*	St. Nicholas Rink • New York, New York	W 4–1	2–4–2
*Non-conference game.
