= 1902–03 Cornell men's ice hockey season =

Record
- Overall: 1–1–0
- Conference: 1–1–0
- Neutral: 1–1–0

Coaches and captains
- Captain: Albert Ellis

The 1902–03 Cornell men's ice hockey season was the 4th season of play for the program.

== Season ==
Playing games was a struggle for Cornell, with the team only able to play two in this season with both coming over a two-day span.

Note: Cornell University did not formally adopt 'Big Red' as its moniker until after 1905. They have been, however, associated with 'Carnelian and White' since the school's Inauguration Day on October 7, 1868.

== Roster ==
No.	Nat.	Player	Class	Pos	Height	Weight	DoB	Hometown	Previous team
		Ervin Armstrong	Junior	F			1883-08-16
	(United States)	Herbert Brown	Junior	F			1882-03-01	Fort Davis, Texas
	(United States)	Charles Day	Senior	G			1883-02-18	Providence, Rhode Island
	(United States)	Carleton Dederer	Junior	D			1880-10-01	Jersey City, New Jersey
		Albert Ellis (C)	Junior	D			1881-04-17
	(United States)	Hugh Ferguson	Graduate	F			1881-03-09	Pittsburgh, Pennsylvania
		John Lee	Senior	F			1879-01-03
	(United States)	Philip Lewis	Junior	F			1883-10-07	Pittsburgh, Pennsylvania
		Sylvester Preston	Sophomore	F			1883-10-25

== Standings ==
1902–03 Collegiate ice hockey standings
	Intercollegiate							Overall					
	GP	W	L	T	PCT.	GF	GA	GP	W	L	T	GF	GA
Brown	4	0	4	0	.000	2	20	6	1	5	0	9	23
Columbia	5	1	3	1	.300	15	17	9	3	5	1	21	28
Cornell	2	1	1	0	.500	4	2	2	1	1	0	4	2
Harvard	7	7	0	0	1.000	33	8	10	10	0	0	51	14
MIT	1	0	1	0	.000	3	4	1	0	1	0	3	4
Princeton	5	2	2	1	.500	14	12	11	5	5	1	44	40
Rensselaer	1	0	1	0	.000	1	2	1	0	1	0	1	2
Williams	1	1	0	0	1.000	2	1	3	2	1	0	9	11
Yale	8	4	4	0	.500	17	24	17	4	12	1	30	83

== Schedule and results ==
Date	Opponent	Site	Result	Record
Regular Season
January 20	vs. Princeton	St. Nicholas Rink • New York, New York	W 4–0	1–0–0 (1–0–0)
January 21	vs. Yale	St. Nicholas Rink • New York, New York	L 0–2	1–1–0 (1–1–0)
*Non-conference game.
