= 1901–02 Brown men's ice hockey season =

- Conference: 4th IHA

Record
- Overall: 2–4–0
- Conference: 1–3–0
- Road: 2–2–0
- Neutral: 0–2–0

Coaches and captains
- Captain: Theodore Pevear

The 1901–02 Brown men's ice hockey season was the 5th season of play for the program.

== Season ==
Brown had a poor start to the season, losing its first four games, including one to a secondary school, before recovering at the end to win its final two contests. Brown didn't play a single game at home and its win over Columbia would be its last over a fellow college for 25 years.

== Roster ==
No.	Nat.	Player	Class	Pos	Height	Weight	DoB	Hometown	Previous team
	(United States)	Asa Briggs	Sophomore				1882-12-09	Hopkinton, Rhode Island
		Charles Carpenter	Junior
		Caleb Farnum	Freshman
		George Francis Jr.	Sophomore
		William Gray	Sophomore
		Stephen Hunt	Sophomore
	(United States)	Noble Judah Jr.	Sophomore				1884-04-23	Chicago, Illinois
		Harold MacKinney	Junior
		Frank Marble	Freshman
		Steven Mason	Sophomore
		Ralph Ostby	Freshman				1882-05-20
	(United States)	Horatio Otis	Sophomore	F			1883-11-29	Providence, Rhode Island
	(United States)	Theodore Pevear (C)	Senior				1881-03-05	Lynn, Massachusetts
		Harry Phillips	Senior	D
	(United States)	Eliot Scudder	Sophomore	F			1882-11-01	Brockton, Massachusetts
		George Walworth	Junior

== Standings ==
1901–02 Collegiate ice hockey standings
	Intercollegiate							Overall					
	GP	W	L	T	PCT.	GF	GA	GP	W	L	T	GF	GA
Brown	5	2	3	0	.400	13	25	6	2	4	0	14	32
Columbia	4	0	4	0	.000	10	23	8	2	4	2	22	30
Cornell	1	0	1	0	.000	0	5	1	0	1	0	0	5
Harvard	6	3	3	0	.500	24	20	10	7	3	0	46	29
MIT	1	0	1	0	.000	0	5	6	3	2	1	15	14
Princeton	4	2	2	0	.500	11	14	9	5	3	1	29	22
Rensselaer	1	0	1	0	.000	1	4	1	0	1	0	1	4
Yale	7	7	0	0	1.000	45	10	17	11	5	1	75	47

1901–02 Intercollegiate Hockey Association standings
	Conference							Overall					
	GP	W	L	T	PTS	GF	GA	GP	W	L	T	GF	GA
Yale *	4	4	0	0	8	31	6	17	11	5	1	75	47
Harvard	4	3	1	0	6	20	11	10	7	3	0	46	29
Princeton	4	2	2	0	4	11	14	9	5	3	1	29	22
Brown	4	1	3	0	2	8	25	6	2	4	0	14	32
Columbia	4	0	4	0	0	10	23	8	2	4	2	22	30
* indicates conference champion

== Schedule and results ==
Date	Opponent	Site	Result	Record
Regular Season
January 25	vs. Yale	St. Nicholas Rink • New York, New York	L 1–11	0–1–0 (0–1–0)
February 1	at Phillips Academy*	Boston, Massachusetts	L 1–7	0–2–0
February 8	at Harvard	Franklin Park • Boston, Massachusetts	L 2–7	0–3–0 (0–2–0)
February 13	vs. Princeton	St. Nicholas Rink • New York, New York	L 0–3	0–4–0 (0–3–0)
February 15	at MIT*	Boston, Massachusetts	W 5–0	1–4–0
February 25	at Columbia	St. Nicholas Rink • New York, New York	W 5–4	2–4–0 (1–3–0)
*Non-conference game.
