= 1902–03 Williams Ephs men's ice hockey season =

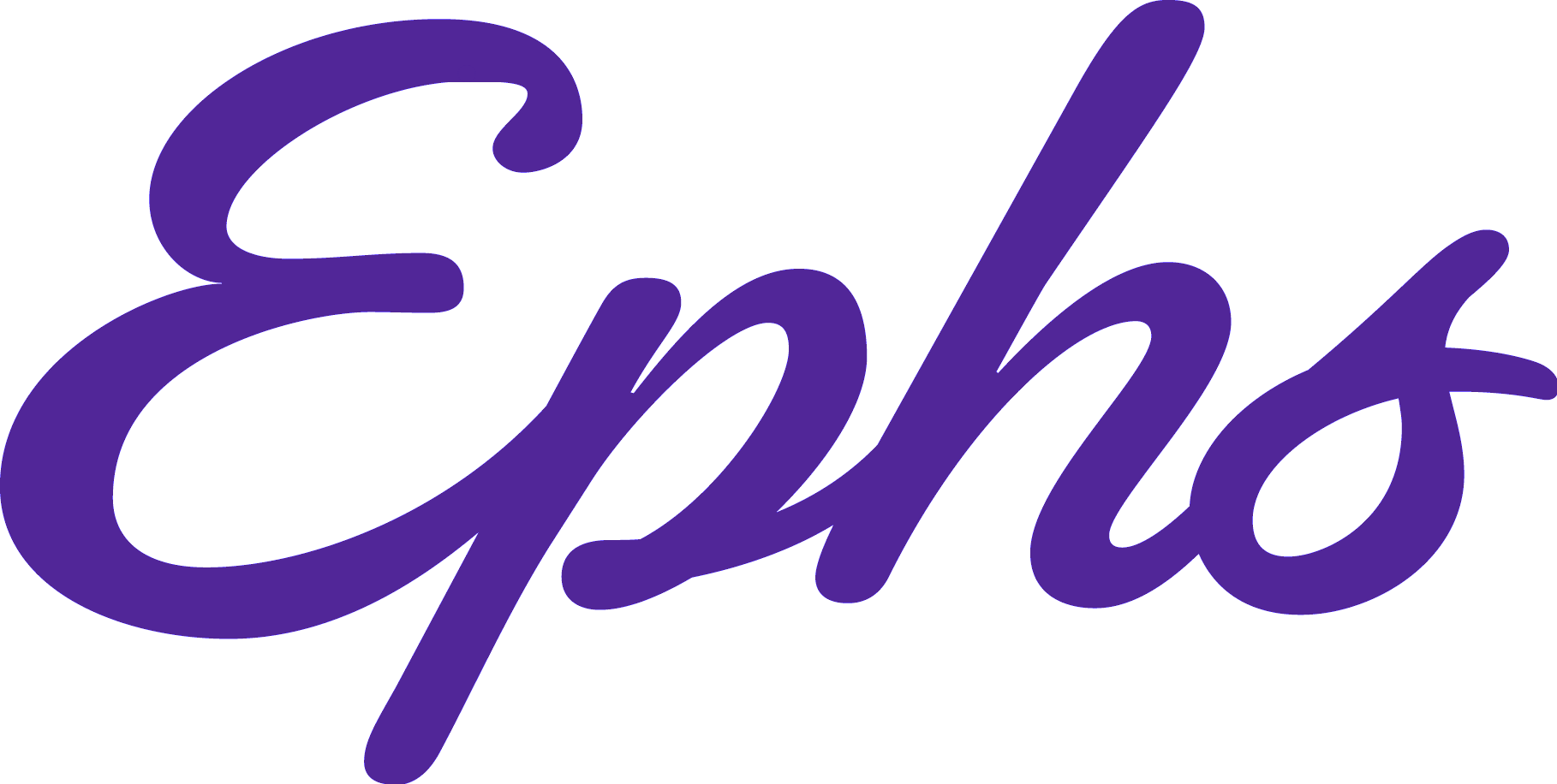
- Home ice: Cole Field House Pond

Record
- Overall: 2–1–0
- Road: 2–1–0

Coaches and captains

The 1902–03 Williams Ephs men's ice hockey season was the inaugural season of play for the program.

== Season ==
A team from Williams had played Rensselaer the year before but they had done so without being official representatives of the college.

== Standings ==
1902–03 Collegiate ice hockey standings
	Intercollegiate							Overall					
	GP	W	L	T	PCT.	GF	GA	GP	W	L	T	GF	GA
Brown	4	0	4	0	.000	2	20	6	1	5	0	9	23
Columbia	5	1	3	1	.300	15	17	9	3	5	1	21	28
Cornell	2	1	1	0	.500	4	2	2	1	1	0	4	2
Harvard	7	7	0	0	1.000	33	8	10	10	0	0	51	14
MIT	1	0	1	0	.000	3	4	1	0	1	0	3	4
Princeton	5	2	2	1	.500	14	12	11	5	5	1	44	40
Rensselaer	1	0	1	0	.000	1	2	1	0	1	0	1	2
Williams	1	1	0	0	1.000	2	1	3	2	1	0	9	11
Yale	8	4	4	0	.500	17	24	17	4	12	1	30	83

== Schedule and results ==
Date	Opponent	Site	Result	Record
Regular Season
January 16	vs. Collegiates*	Empire Rink • Albany, New York	L 2–10	0–1–0
January 24	vs. Hoosac School*	Hoosick, New York	W 5–0	1–1–0
February 21	at Rensselaer*	Empire Rink • Albany, New York	W 2–1	2–1–0
*Non-conference game.
