= Joseph Stillburg =

Austrian-American architect (born 1847)

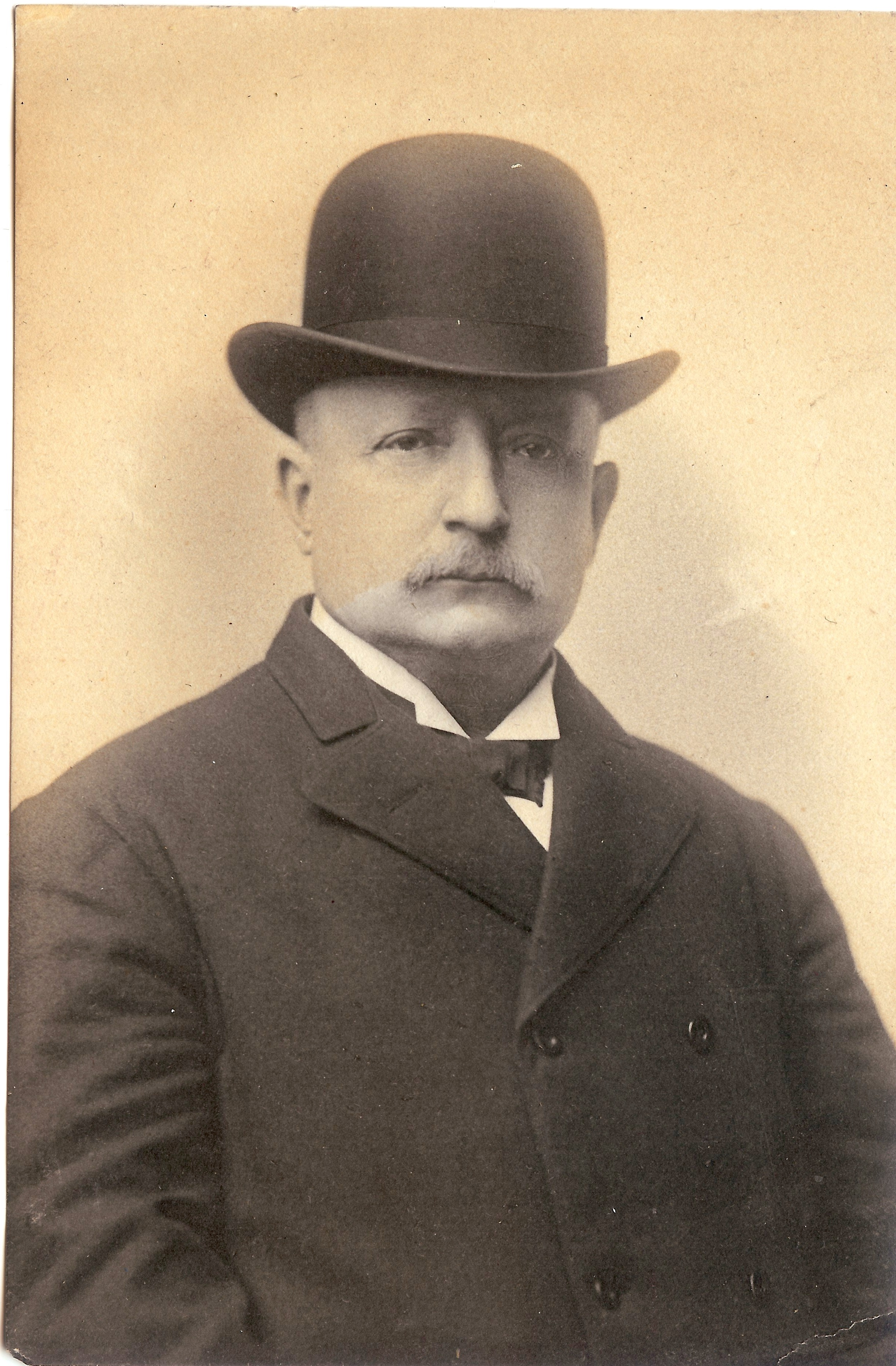
Joseph Stillburg

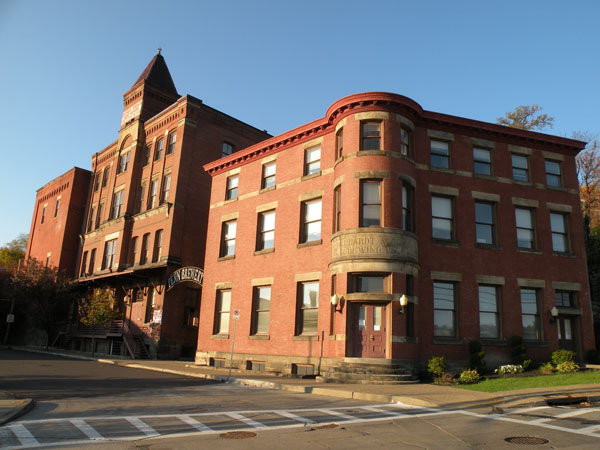
Eberhardt & Ober Brewery (Penn Brewery and Brewery Innovation Center)

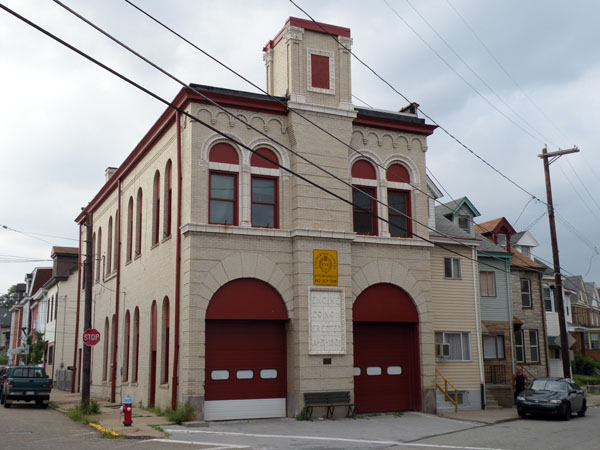
Troy Hill Fire Station#39

Joseph Stiller von Stillburg (August 24, 1847 – December 23, 1923) was an Austrian-American architect from Pittsburgh, Pennsylvania.

== Early life ==
Stillburg was born in the Austrian Empire to Joseph Stillburg Sr. and Marie Berchschnieder. He served in the Austrian Army during the Austro-Prussian War in 1866, where he survived a deadly cholera outbreak while stationed in Trieste. The soldiers were forbidden from drinking water or eating fruit and vegetables, and survived on red wine.

He immigrated to the United States in 1868 and married Amelia Hoenig in 1879. Amelia Hoenig was born in Wisconsin in 1856 to Freiderika Schiller Moeier and Oskur Koenig (the 1860 census spelled their last name as Koenig not Hoenig). Her father was born in 1827 and her mother in 1833, both in Saxony. She had a brother Albert (1859) and a sister Louisa (1853). They lived in a German community in Green Bay, Wisconsin.

Joseph Stillburg and his wife Amelia had four sons. Their first son, Joseph, only lived less than one year, having been born October 26, 1880, and dying on October 14, 1881. He is buried like Amelia and Joseph in Woodlawn Cemetery in Green Bay, Wisconsin. Frederick Albert (1882–1952) was an architect like his dad. He taught at Carnegie Institute of Technology in the 1920s. During Prohibition, he had a still in the family's attic. Osker (born 1885–1914) was an architect as well. He died on May 26, 1914, at 3pm, in Green Bay, Wisconsin, of pneumonia at the age of 28. He was in Green Bay due to his father forbidding him to marry a girl that he loved in Pittsburgh. Albert James (1893–1977) was born on December 7, 1893. He was an accountant. He married Mildred Reese and had two daughters, Jean and Nancy. Frederick apparently suffered from mental illness; in 1937 he was homeless and arrested in Los Angeles after causing a scene in which he declared himself to be Kaiser of Austria and the King of Hungary.

== Career ==
Stillburg's work includes the Winter Garden at Exposition Hall. He also designed the Eberhardt & Ober Brewery (Penn Brewery and Brewery Innovation Center) and Troy Hill Fire Station #39 (1901). He is also credited as the architect of the Suibertus G. Mollinger / St. Anthony of Padua Shrine. Frederick J. Osterling trained in his office.

Stillburg's best-known work, however, is the Administration Building at Seton Hill University. Completed in 1889, the building was constructed with Pittsburgh brick and Ohio sandstone and was designed for the St. Joseph Academy for Girls and was subsequently occupied by Seton Hill College in 1918.

== Death ==
Stillburg died of liver cancer in 1923.
