= 1901–02 United States collegiate men's ice hockey season =

- Duration: December 1901– March 1902
- Collegiate champion: Yale

The 1901–02 United States collegiate men's ice hockey season was the 8th season of collegiate ice hockey.

== Regular season ==
=== Standings ===
1901–02 Collegiate ice hockey standings
	Intercollegiate							Overall					
	GP	W	L	T	PCT.	GF	GA	GP	W	L	T	GF	GA
Brown	5	2	3	0	.400	13	25	6	2	4	0	14	32
Columbia	4	0	4	0	.000	10	23	8	2	4	2	22	30
Cornell	1	0	1	0	.000	0	5	1	0	1	0	0	5
Harvard	6	3	3	0	.500	24	20	10	7	3	0	46	29
MIT	1	0	1	0	.000	0	5	6	3	2	1	15	14
Princeton	4	2	2	0	.500	11	14	9	5	3	1	29	22
Rensselaer	1	0	1	0	.000	1	4	1	0	1	0	1	4
Yale	7	7	0	0	1.000	45	10	17	11	5	1	75	47

1901–02 Intercollegiate Hockey Association standings
	Conference							Overall					
	GP	W	L	T	PTS	GF	GA	GP	W	L	T	GF	GA
Yale *	4	4	0	0	8	31	6	17	11	5	1	75	47
Harvard	4	3	1	0	6	20	11	10	7	3	0	46	29
Princeton	4	2	2	0	4	11	14	9	5	3	1	29	22
Brown	4	1	3	0	2	8	25	6	2	4	0	14	32
Columbia	4	0	4	0	0	10	23	8	2	4	2	22	30
* indicates conference champion
