= 1902–03 MIT Engineers men's ice hockey season =

- Conference: Independent

Record
- Overall: 0–1–0

Coaches and captains
- Captain: George Bateman

The 1902–03 MIT Engineers men's ice hockey season was the 5th season of play for the program.

== Season ==
The season began on a sour note when team member and ice hockey club president Frank Falvey died due to acute peritonitis. A game against Phillips Andover was cancelled as a result but the team did eventually return to the ice against Harvard. After the game against the Crimson, MIT cancelled the remainder of their season in honor of Falvey.

The team did not have a head coach but P. S. Crowell served as team manager.

Note: Massachusetts Institute of Technology athletics were referred to as 'Engineers' or 'Techmen' during the first two decades of the 20th century. By 1920 all sports programs had adopted the Engineer moniker.

== Roster ==
No.	Nat.	Player	Class	Pos	Height	Weight	DoB	Hometown	Previous team
		George Bateman (C)	Senior	F
		Lawrence Dean	Sophomore	G
		Frank Falvey	Sophomore	F
		Albert Magnitzky	Senior	F
		Rufus Reed	Sophomore	D
		Horace Simpson	Graduate	D
		William Van Amringe	Freshman	F

== Standings ==
1902–03 Collegiate ice hockey standings
	Intercollegiate							Overall					
	GP	W	L	T	PCT.	GF	GA	GP	W	L	T	GF	GA
Brown	4	0	4	0	.000	2	20	6	1	5	0	9	23
Columbia	5	1	3	1	.300	15	17	9	3	5	1	21	28
Cornell	2	1	1	0	.500	4	2	2	1	1	0	4	2
Harvard	7	7	0	0	1.000	33	8	10	10	0	0	51	14
MIT	1	0	1	0	.000	3	4	1	0	1	0	3	4
Princeton	5	2	2	1	.500	14	12	11	5	5	1	44	40
Rensselaer	1	0	1	0	.000	1	2	1	0	1	0	1	2
Williams	1	1	0	0	1.000	2	1	3	2	1	0	9	11
Yale	8	4	4	0	.500	17	24	17	4	12	1	30	83

== Schedule and results ==
Date	Opponent	Site	Result	Record
Regular Season
January 11	at Harvard	Holmes Field • Boston, Massachusetts	L 3–4	
*Non-conference game.
