= 1901–02 Cornell men's ice hockey season =

Record
- Overall: 0–1–0
- Conference: 0–1–0
- Neutral: 0–1–0

Coaches and captains
- Captain: Herbert Wood

The 1901–02 Cornell men's ice hockey season was the 3rd season of play for the program.

== Season ==
After a successful first foray in 1901, Cornell ran into an obstacle in its second season of ice hockey. The issue was the lack of available ice, a problem they shared with most other colleges at the time. While Brown, Harvard, Princeton, and Yale were able to secure ice time at St. Nicholas Rink, one of the only consistently available rinks at the time, Cornell found themselves frozen out most of the time.

As a result, Cornell would play only a single game in 1902.

Note: Cornell University did not formally adopt 'Big Red' as its moniker until after 1905. They have been, however, associated with 'Carnelian and White' since the school's Inauguration Day on October 7, 1868.

== Roster ==
No.	Nat.	Player	Class	Pos	Height	Weight	DoB	Hometown	Previous team
		Ervin Armstrong	Sophomore	F			1883-08-16
	(United States)	Charles Day	Junior	G			1883-02-18	Providence, Rhode Island
	(United States)	Carleton Dederer	Sophomore	D			1880-10-01	Jersey City, New Jersey
		Albert Ellis	Sophomore	D			1881-04-17
		John Lee	Junior	F			1879-01-03
	(United States)	Philip Lewis	Sophomore	F			1883-10-07	Pittsburgh, Pennsylvania
	(Canada)	Herbert Wood (C)	Senior	F			1877-05-10	Sackville, New Brunswick

== Standings ==
1901–02 Collegiate ice hockey standings
	Intercollegiate							Overall					
	GP	W	L	T	PCT.	GF	GA	GP	W	L	T	GF	GA
Brown	5	2	3	0	.400	13	25	6	2	4	0	14	32
Columbia	4	0	4	0	.000	10	23	8	2	4	2	22	30
Cornell	1	0	1	0	.000	0	5	1	0	1	0	0	5
Harvard	6	3	3	0	.500	24	20	10	7	3	0	46	29
MIT	1	0	1	0	.000	0	5	6	3	2	1	15	14
Princeton	4	2	2	0	.500	11	14	9	5	3	1	29	22
Rensselaer	1	0	1	0	.000	1	4	1	0	1	0	1	4
Yale	7	7	0	0	1.000	45	10	17	11	5	1	75	47

== Schedule and results ==
Date	Opponent	Site	Result	Record
Regular Season
February 22	vs. Yale	St. Nicholas Rink • New York, New York	L 0–5	0–1–0 (0–1–0)
*Non-conference game.
