= 1902–03 Harvard Crimson men's ice hockey season =

College ice hockey season

Intercollegiate Champion Intercollegiate Hockey Association, Champion
- Conference: 1st IHA

Record
- Overall: 10–0–0
- Conference: 7–0–0
- Home: 4–0–0
- Road: 1–0–0
- Neutral: 5–0–0

Coaches and captains
- Captain: Joseph Lovering

The 1902–03 Harvard Crimson men's ice hockey season was the sixth season of play for the program.

== Season ==
After losing all three contests against Yale the year before, Harvard made no mistake in defeating the Elis thrice in 1903. The victories capped off Harvard's second undefeated season but this time, as a member of the Intercollegiate Hockey Association, the Crimson captured their first championship as well.

== Roster ==
| No. | Nat. | Player | Class | Pos | Height | Weight | DoB | Hometown | Previous team |
|---|---|---|---|---|---|---|---|---|---|
| | | Guilliaem Aertsen Jr. | Sophomore | D |
| | (United States) | Proctor Carr | Junior | D | | | | Andover, New Hampshire |
| | (United States) | William Clothier | Junior | D | | | 1881-09-27 | Sharon Hill, Pennsylvania |
| | | John Foster | Senior | F |
| | | Hugh Kernan | | F |
| | | Bayard Litchfield | Senior | G |
| | (United States) | Joseph Lovering (C) | Senior | F | | | 1882-01-07 | Boston, Massachusetts |
| | | Eldon MacLeod | Freshman | F | | | 1883-03-18 |
| | (United States) | John Manning | Senior | G | | | 1879-06-03 | Boston, Massachusetts |
| | | Marshall | | D |
| | | George Metcalf | Freshman | F |
| | (United States) | Daniel Newhall | Freshman | D | | | 1884-12-03 | Philadelphia, Pennsylvania |
| | | Bernon Prentice | Sophomore | F |
| | | Harold Read | Senior |
| | (United States) | Theodore Robinson | Junior | F | | | 1883-04-28 | New York, New York |
| | (United States) | Tristam Souther | Junior | F | | | 1881-11-11 | New York, New York |
| | | William Tilden | Sophomore | G |
| | | Albert Waite | Sophomore | F |

== Standings ==
1902–03 Collegiate ice hockey standings
| | Intercollegiate | | | | | | | Overall | | | | | |
| | GP | W | L | T | PCT. | GF | GA | GP | W | L | T | GF | GA |
|---|---|---|---|---|---|---|---|---|---|---|---|---|---|
| Brown | 4 | 0 | 4 | 0 | .000 | 2 | 20 | 6 | 1 | 5 | 0 | 9 | 23 |
| Columbia | 5 | 1 | 3 | 1 | .300 | 15 | 17 | 9 | 3 | 5 | 1 | 21 | 28 |
| Cornell | 2 | 1 | 1 | 0 | .500 | 4 | 2 | 2 | 1 | 1 | 0 | 4 | 2 |
| Harvard | 7 | 7 | 0 | 0 | 1.000 | 33 | 8 | 10 | 10 | 0 | 0 | 51 | 14 |
| MIT | 1 | 0 | 1 | 0 | .000 | 3 | 4 | 1 | 0 | 1 | 0 | 3 | 4 |
| Princeton | 5 | 2 | 2 | 1 | .500 | 14 | 12 | 11 | 5 | 5 | 1 | 44 | 40 |
| Rensselaer | 1 | 0 | 1 | 0 | .000 | 1 | 2 | 1 | 0 | 1 | 0 | 1 | 2 |
| Williams | 1 | 1 | 0 | 0 | 1.000 | 2 | 1 | 3 | 2 | 1 | 0 | 9 | 11 |
| Yale | 8 | 4 | 4 | 0 | .500 | 17 | 24 | 17 | 4 | 12 | 1 | 30 | 83 |

1902–03 Intercollegiate Hockey Association standings
| | Conference | | | | | | | | Overall | | | | | |
| | GP | W | L | T | PTS | GF | GA | | GP | W | L | T | GF | GA |
|---|---|---|---|---|---|---|---|---|---|---|---|---|---|---|
| Harvard * | 4 | 4 | 0 | 0 | 8 | 18 | 2 | | 10 | 10 | 0 | 0 | 51 | 14 |
| Yale | 4 | 2 | 2 | 0 | 4 | 11 | 8 | | 17 | 4 | 12 | 1 | 30 | 83 |
| Columbia | 4 | 2 | 2 | 0 | 4 | 12 | 14 | † | 9 | 3 | 5 | 1 | 21 | 28 |
| Princeton | 4 | 2 | 2 | 0 | 4 | 14 | 8 | † | 11 | 5 | 5 | 1 | 44 | 40 |
| Brown | 4 | 0 | 4 | 0 | 0 | 2 | 20 | | 6 | 1 | 5 | 0 | 9 | 23 |
* indicates conference champion † Princeton's team disbanded before a tie with Columbia could be settled and was forced to forfeit the game.

== Schedule and results ==
| Date | Opponent | Site | Result | Record |
Regular Season
| December 20 | Boston Hockey Club* | Holmes Field • Boston, Massachusetts | W 4–2 | 1–0–0 |
| January 10 | MIT* | Holmes Field • Boston, Massachusetts | W 4–3 | 2–0–0 |
| January 10 | Boston Hockey Club* | Holmes Field • Boston, Massachusetts | W 5–1 | 3–0–0 |
| January 17 | vs. Princeton | St. Nicholas Rink • New York, New York | W 4–1 | 4–0–0 (1–0–0) |
| January 24 | Boston Hockey Club* | Holmes Field • Boston, Massachusetts | W 9–3 | 5–0–0 |
| January 31 | at Columbia | St. Nicholas Rink • New York, New York | W 5–1 | 6–0–0 (2–0–0) |
| February 21 | vs. Yale | St. Nicholas Rink • New York, New York (Rivalry) | W 3–0 | 7–0–0 (3–0–0) |
| February 23 | vs. Brown | St. Nicholas Rink • New York, New York | W 6–0 | 8–0–0 (4–0–0) |
| February 27 | vs. Yale* | St. Nicholas Rink • New York, New York (IHA Championship Game 1, Rivalry) | W 6–2 | 9–0–0 |
| February 28 | vs. Yale* | St. Nicholas Rink • New York, New York (IHA Championship Game 2, Rivalry) | W 5–1 | 10–0–0 |
*Non-conference game.
