= 1902–03 United States collegiate men's ice hockey season =

- Duration: December 1902– March 1903
- Collegiate champion: Harvard

The 1902–03 United States collegiate men's ice hockey season was the 9th season of collegiate ice hockey.

== Regular season ==
=== Standings ===
1902–03 Collegiate ice hockey standings
	Intercollegiate							Overall					
	GP	W	L	T	PCT.	GF	GA	GP	W	L	T	GF	GA
Brown	4	0	4	0	.000	2	20	6	1	5	0	9	23
Columbia	5	1	3	1	.300	15	17	9	3	5	1	21	28
Cornell	2	1	1	0	.500	4	2	2	1	1	0	4	2
Harvard	7	7	0	0	1.000	33	8	10	10	0	0	51	14
MIT	1	0	1	0	.000	3	4	1	0	1	0	3	4
Princeton	5	2	2	1	.500	14	12	11	5	5	1	44	40
Rensselaer	1	0	1	0	.000	1	2	1	0	1	0	1	2
Williams	1	1	0	0	1.000	2	1	3	2	1	0	9	11
Yale	8	4	4	0	.500	17	24	17	4	12	1	30	83

1902–03 Intercollegiate Hockey Association standings
	Conference								Overall					
	GP	W	L	T	PTS	GF	GA		GP	W	L	T	GF	GA
Harvard *	4	4	0	0	8	18	2		10	10	0	0	51	14
Yale	4	2	2	0	4	11	8		17	4	12	1	30	83
Columbia	4	2	2	0	4	12	14	†	9	3	5	1	21	28
Princeton	4	2	2	0	4	14	8	†	11	5	5	1	44	40
Brown	4	0	4	0	0	2	20		6	1	5	0	9	23
* indicates conference champion † Princeton's team disbanded before a tie with Columbia could be settled and was forced to forfeit the game.
