= 1901–02 Harvard Crimson men's ice hockey season =

College ice hockey season

- Conference: 2nd IHA

Record
- Overall: 7–3–0
- Conference: 3–1–0
- Home: 5–0–0
- Road: 1–0–0
- Neutral: 1–3–0

Coaches and captains
- Captain: Alfred Winsor

The 1901–02 Harvard Crimson men's ice hockey season was the fifth season of play for the program.

== Season ==
Hopes were high for Harvard entering the season and the Crimson got off to a good start but were stymied by Yale in their third game. After defeating Princeton Harvard still had a chance to win the Intercollegiate Championship with two final games against the Bulldogs but the Elis proved to be better by taking both and ending Harvard's season on a sour note.

Though the result was disappointing the future was looking bright for Harvard; this was the last season that the Crimson would not finish with a winning intercollegiate record for 22 years.

== Roster ==
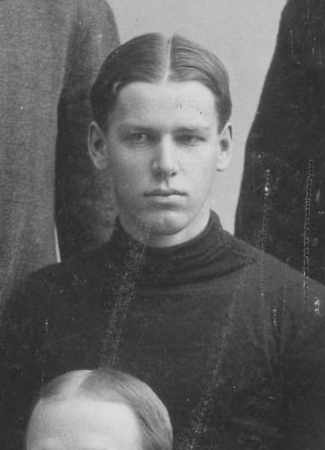
Alfred Winsor with the Harvard ice hockey team.

No.	Nat.	Player	Class	Pos	Height	Weight	DoB	Hometown	Previous team
	(United States)	Proctor Carr	Sophomore	D				Andover, New Hampshire
		Paul Fosdick	Sophomore	F			1882-08-11
		John Foster	Junior
	(United States)	Joseph Lovering	Junior	D			1882-01-07	Boston, Massachusetts
	(United States)	John Manning	Junior	G			1879-06-03	Boston, Massachusetts
	(United States)	Hallam Movius	Senior	D			1880-09-22	Buffalo, New York
		Dunlap Penhallow	Junior	D			1880-08-09
	(United States)	Robert Pruyn	Senior	F			1879-10-11	Albany, New York
	(United States)	Charles Rumsey	Senior	F			1879-08-29	Buffalo, New York
	(United States)	Alfred Winsor (C)	Senior	F			1879-08-29	Brookline, Massachusetts

== Standings ==
1901–02 Collegiate ice hockey standings
	Intercollegiate							Overall					
	GP	W	L	T	PCT.	GF	GA	GP	W	L	T	GF	GA
Brown	5	2	3	0	.400	13	25	6	2	4	0	14	32
Columbia	4	0	4	0	.000	10	23	8	2	4	2	22	30
Cornell	1	0	1	0	.000	0	5	1	0	1	0	0	5
Harvard	6	3	3	0	.500	24	20	10	7	3	0	46	29
MIT	1	0	1	0	.000	0	5	6	3	2	1	15	14
Princeton	4	2	2	0	.500	11	14	9	5	3	1	29	22
Rensselaer	1	0	1	0	.000	1	4	1	0	1	0	1	4
Yale	7	7	0	0	1.000	45	10	17	11	5	1	75	47

1901–02 Intercollegiate Hockey Association standings
	Conference							Overall					
	GP	W	L	T	PTS	GF	GA	GP	W	L	T	GF	GA
Yale *	4	4	0	0	8	31	6	17	11	5	1	75	47
Harvard	4	3	1	0	6	20	11	10	7	3	0	46	29
Princeton	4	2	2	0	4	11	14	9	5	3	1	29	22
Brown	4	1	3	0	2	8	25	6	2	4	0	14	32
Columbia	4	0	4	0	0	10	23	8	2	4	2	22	30
* indicates conference champion

== Schedule and results ==
Date	Opponent	Site	Result	Record
Regular Season
January 11	Newtowne Athletic Association*	Holmes Field • Boston, Massachusetts	W 4–1	1–0–0
January 18	at Columbia	St. Nicholas Rink • New York, New York	W 4–3	2–0–0 (1–0–0)
January 25	Phillips Academy*	Holmes Field • Boston, Massachusetts	W 6–4	3–0–0
February 1	Newtowne Athletic Association*	Holmes Field • Boston, Massachusetts	W 7–2	4–0–0
February 8	Brown	Holmes Field • Boston, Massachusetts	W 7–1	5–0–0 (2–0–0)
February 10	Boston Hockey Club*	Holmes Field • Boston, Massachusetts	W 5–2	6–0–0
February 15	vs. Yale	St. Nicholas Rink • New York, New York (Rivalry)	L 3–4	6–1–0 (2–1–0)
March 1	vs. Princeton	St. Nicholas Rink • New York, New York	W 6–3	7–1–0 (3–1–0)
March 14	vs. Yale*	St. Nicholas Rink • New York, New York (IHA Championship Game 1, Rivalry)	L 3–5	7–2–0
March 15	vs. Yale*	St. Nicholas Rink • New York, New York (IHA Championship Game 2, Rivalry)	L 1–4	7–3–0
*Non-conference game.
