= 1902–03 Brown men's ice hockey season =

- Conference: 5th IHA

Record
- Overall: 1–5–0
- Conference: 0–4–0
- Home: 1–1–0
- Road: 0–3–0
- Neutral: 0–1–0

Coaches and captains
- Captain: Harold MacKinney

The 1902–03 Brown men's ice hockey season was the 6th season of play for the program.

== Season ==
Brown followed a poor 1902 season with an even worse performance. The Brunos won a single game, against a local high school, and in their five other contests they could only muster 2 goals, finishing the season dead least in intercollegiate play.

== Roster ==
No.	Nat.	Player	Class	Pos	Height	Weight	DoB	Hometown	Previous team
		Stephen Ames	Freshman
		William Budlong	Freshman
		Charles Carpenter	Senior
		Frederic Cook	Sophomore
		George Francis Jr.	Junior
		Henry Gardner	Sophomore
		Stephen Hunt	Junior
	(United States)	Noble Judah Jr.	Junior				1884-04-23	Chicago, Illinois
		Harold MacKinney (C)	Senior
		Frank Marble	Sophomore
		Steven Mason	Junior
		Paul Matteson	Junior
		Ralph Ostby	Sophomore				1882-05-20
	(United States)	Horatio Otis	Junior	F			1883-11-29	Providence, Rhode Island
	(United States)	Eliot Scudder	Junior	F			1882-11-01	Brockton, Massachusetts
		George Walworth	Senior

== Standings ==
1902–03 Collegiate ice hockey standings
	Intercollegiate							Overall					
	GP	W	L	T	PCT.	GF	GA	GP	W	L	T	GF	GA
Brown	4	0	4	0	.000	2	20	6	1	5	0	9	23
Columbia	5	1	3	1	.300	15	17	9	3	5	1	21	28
Cornell	2	1	1	0	.500	4	2	2	1	1	0	4	2
Harvard	7	7	0	0	1.000	33	8	10	10	0	0	51	14
MIT	1	0	1	0	.000	3	4	1	0	1	0	3	4
Princeton	5	2	2	1	.500	14	12	11	5	5	1	44	40
Rensselaer	1	0	1	0	.000	1	2	1	0	1	0	1	2
Williams	1	1	0	0	1.000	2	1	3	2	1	0	9	11
Yale	8	4	4	0	.500	17	24	17	4	12	1	30	83

1902–03 Intercollegiate Hockey Association standings
	Conference								Overall					
	GP	W	L	T	PTS	GF	GA		GP	W	L	T	GF	GA
Harvard *	4	4	0	0	8	18	2		10	10	0	0	51	14
Yale	4	2	2	0	4	11	8		17	4	12	1	30	83
Columbia	4	2	2	0	4	12	14	†	9	3	5	1	21	28
Princeton	4	2	2	0	4	14	8	†	11	5	5	1	44	40
Brown	4	0	4	0	0	2	20		6	1	5	0	9	23
* indicates conference champion † Princeton's team disbanded before a tie with Columbia could be settled and was forced to forfeit the game.

== Schedule and results ==
Date	Opponent	Site	Result	Record
Regular Season
January 10	vs. Princeton	St. Nicholas Rink • New York, New York	L 1–7	0–1–0 (0–1–0)
January 15	Hope High School*	Aldrich Field Rink • Providence, Rhode Island	W 7–2	1–1–0
January 24	at Yale	New Haven, Connecticut	L 0–2	1–2–0 (0–2–0)
February 7	Boston Hockey Club*	Aldrich Field Rink • Providence, Rhode Island	L 0–1	1–3–0
February 14	at Columbia	St. Nicholas Rink • New York, New York	L 1–5	1–4–0 (0–3–0)
February 23	at Harvard	Franklin Park • Boston, Massachusetts	L 0–6	1–5–0 (0–4–0)
*Non-conference game.
