= 1902–03 RPI men's ice hockey season =

RPI's 1902-03 men's ice hockey season: the program's second year

- Conference: Independent

Record
- Overall: 0–1–0
- Conference: 0–1–0
- Home: 0–1–0

Coaches and captains
- Captain: Carleton Brown

The 1902–03 RPI men's ice hockey season was the 2nd season of play for the program.

== Season ==
RPI played only a single game against Williams College.

Note: Rensselaer's athletic teams were unofficially known as 'Cherry and White' until 1921 when the Engineers moniker debuted for the men's basketball team.

== Roster ==
No.	Nat.	Player	Class	Pos	Height	Weight	DoB	Hometown	Previous team
		Carleton Brown (C)	Junior

== Standings ==
1902–03 Collegiate ice hockey standings
	Intercollegiate							Overall					
	GP	W	L	T	PCT.	GF	GA	GP	W	L	T	GF	GA
Brown	4	0	4	0	.000	2	20	6	1	5	0	9	23
Columbia	5	1	3	1	.300	15	17	9	3	5	1	21	28
Cornell	2	1	1	0	.500	4	2	2	1	1	0	4	2
Harvard	7	7	0	0	1.000	33	8	10	10	0	0	51	14
MIT	1	0	1	0	.000	3	4	1	0	1	0	3	4
Princeton	5	2	2	1	.500	14	12	11	5	5	1	44	40
Rensselaer	1	0	1	0	.000	1	2	1	0	1	0	1	2
Williams	1	1	0	0	1.000	2	1	3	2	1	0	9	11
Yale	8	4	4	0	.500	17	24	17	4	12	1	30	83

== Schedule and results ==
Date	Opponent	Site	Result	Record
Regular Season
February 21	Williams	Empire Rink • Albany, New York	L 1–2	0–1–0 (0–1–0)
*Non-conference game.
