= 1901–02 MIT Engineers men's ice hockey season =

- Conference: Independent

Record
- Overall: 3–3–0

Coaches and captains
- Captain: Francis Smith

The 1901–02 MIT Engineers men's ice hockey season was the 4th season of play for the program.

== Season ==
After the successful completion of their previous season, the men's team received much more interest from the student body. MIT had difficulty in playing games early in the season; twice their opponents failed to show up but they were still able to play a couple of games by early February. Even when they played games they weren't always able to finish them on the same day. At least two games that ended in a tie were later continued.

The team did not have a head coach but Harry Stiles served as team manager.

Note: Massachusetts Institute of Technology athletics were referred to as 'Engineers' or 'Techmen' during the first two decades of the 20th century. By 1920 all sports programs had adopted the Engineer moniker.

== Roster ==
| No. | Nat. | Player | Class | Pos | Height | Weight | DoB | Hometown | Previous team |
|---|---|---|---|---|---|---|---|---|---|
| | | George Bateman | Junior | F |
| | | Lawrence Dean | Freshman | G |
| | | Frank Falvey | Freshman | F |
| | | Albert Magnitzky | Junior | F |
| | | Arthur Nickerson | Senior | D |
| | | Horace Simpson | Senior | D |
| | | Francis Smith (C) | Senior | F |

== Standings ==
1901–02 Collegiate ice hockey standings
| | Intercollegiate | | | | | | | Overall | | | | | |
| | GP | W | L | T | PCT. | GF | GA | GP | W | L | T | GF | GA |
|---|---|---|---|---|---|---|---|---|---|---|---|---|---|
| Brown | 5 | 2 | 3 | 0 | .400 | 13 | 25 | 6 | 2 | 4 | 0 | 14 | 32 |
| Columbia | 4 | 0 | 4 | 0 | .000 | 10 | 23 | 8 | 2 | 4 | 2 | 22 | 30 |
| Cornell | 1 | 0 | 1 | 0 | .000 | 0 | 5 | 1 | 0 | 1 | 0 | 0 | 5 |
| Harvard | 6 | 3 | 3 | 0 | .500 | 24 | 20 | 10 | 7 | 3 | 0 | 46 | 29 |
| MIT | 1 | 0 | 1 | 0 | .000 | 0 | 5 | 6 | 3 | 2 | 1 | 15 | 14 |
| Princeton | 4 | 2 | 2 | 0 | .500 | 11 | 14 | 9 | 5 | 3 | 1 | 29 | 22 |
| Rensselaer | 1 | 0 | 1 | 0 | .000 | 1 | 4 | 1 | 0 | 1 | 0 | 1 | 4 |
| Yale | 7 | 7 | 0 | 0 | 1.000 | 45 | 10 | 17 | 11 | 5 | 1 | 75 | 47 |

== Schedule and results ==
| Date | Opponent | Site | Result | Record |
Regular Season
| | Andover Town Team* | | T 2–2 | 0–0–1 |
| | Jamaica Plain* | | W 5–1 | 1–0–1 |
| | Phillips Academy* | | L 2–5 | 1–1–1 |
| | Brookline High School* | | W 1–0 | 2–1–1 |
| February 12, 22 | vs. Dorchester Athletic Association* | Jamaica Pond & Franklin Park • Boston, Massachusetts | W 5–1 | 3–1–1 |
| February 15 | vs. Brown* | Boston, Massachusetts | L 0–5 | 3–2–1 |
*Non-conference game.
