= Pittsburgh Winter Garden hockey team =

Pittsburgh Winter Garden
- City: Pittsburgh, Pennsylvania, United States
- League: Independent
- Operated: 1915–1916
- Home arena: Winter Garden at Exposition Hall
- Colors: Black and gold
- General manager: Arthur Sixsmith
- Head coach: Arthur Sixsmith
- Media: Pittsburgh Press

The Pittsburgh Winter Garden hockey team was an amateur ice hockey team based in Pittsburgh, Pennsylvania. The team received its name from its home arena, the Winter Garden at Exposition Hall, and played only four games, winning one and losing three, in its only season of 1915–16. The Winter Garden team was managed and coached by Arthur Sixsmith and consisted of several players from the defunct Western Pennsylvania Hockey League (WPHL), which was the first openly professional hockey league. Despite the fact that former professional players were on the team, the club remained strictly amateur. Lorne Campbell and Arthur's brother, Garnet Sixsmith, played on the Winter Garden team and were both alumni of the WPHL.

== History ==
Around 1914, public interest in ice skating was growing in Pittsburgh and that interest served was the focus for converting the Main Hall of Exposition Hall into the Winter Garden. Hockey was a growing sport in Pittsburgh and had been played at the Duquesne Garden, which was located in the city's Oakland neighborhood. However, ice time at the Duquesne Garden was scarce while the demand for hockey was growing. In 1915, chiller pipes and concrete were added to the floor of the Main Hall to create an impressive ice surface. The size of the playing surface used for the Exposition's hockey games was 300 feet (91 m) x 140 feet (43 m) and was bigger than today's international size rinks. By comparison, today's National Hockey League rinks measure 200 feet (61 m) x 85 feet (26 m). The increased size wore down visiting opponents and heavily favored the home teams. While the Winter Garden team was formed in late 1915 by Arthur Sixsmith, Roy Schooley, the manager of the Duquesne Garden, began putting together his "Duquesne Garden hockey team". A rivalry soon began between the two clubs. The Duquesne and Winter Garden teams each played out-of-town opponents, sometimes on the same night, and in direct competition of one another.

The Winter Garden team debuted by losing two games to the Detroit Hockey Club. Richard Guy of The Gazette Times wrote after the first contest, "Pittsburgh showed an array of old-timers who failed to exhibit careful preparations and the result was that they were short of wind."

Not until seven weeks later did the team play its next (and last) two games, this time against the Sudbury All-Stars, who were considered one of the best teams in Canada. Winter Garden defeated Sudbury, 2–0, in the first game of the series. During that game, Pittsburgh's "Kewpie" Young collided with Sudbury's Shorty Green, resulting in the loss of several of Young's teeth. The Sudbury players were reportedly overwhelmed by the size of the Garden's ice surface. However, Winter Garden would go on to drop the series' second game to Sudbury, 3–1.

The team's meager record contrasted with the success of the rival Duquesne Garden team, which finished the season 20–3–0 and received acclaim as one of the strongest amateur teams in North America.

== Schedule and results ==
All games were played at the Winter Garden at Exposition Hall, Pittsburgh.

No.	Date	Opponent	Result	Source
1	December 6, 1915	Detroit	L 2–3	
2	December 7, 1915	Detroit	L 2–4	
3	January 24, 1916	Sudbury	W 2–0	
4	January 25, 1916	Sudbury	L 1–3	
