= 1901–02 Princeton Tigers men's ice hockey season =

College ice hockey season

- Conference: 3rd IHA

Record
- Overall: 5–3–1
- Conference: 2–2–0
- Road: 4–1–1
- Neutral: 1–2–0

Coaches and captains
- Captain: Montgomery Ogden

The 1901–02 Princeton Tigers men's ice hockey season was the 3rd season of play for the program.

== Season ==
After a slow start Princeton won five consecutive games to finish with a respectable record. The team did not play any 'home' games as there was no available ice rink near its campus. Instead the Tigers played a majority of their games at the St. Nicholas Rink (a common practice for many colleges at the time).

== Roster ==
No.	Nat.	Player	Class	Pos	Height	Weight	DoB	Hometown	Previous team
		Elliot Brown	Sophomore	G
		Alfred King	Freshman	G
		Robert Leake	Sophomore	F
		Henry Lloyd	Freshman	F
		David McAlpin II	Senior	F
		Stephen McClave	Junior	F/D
		Montgomery Ogden (C)	Senior	F
	(United States)	Lyttleton Purnell	Sophomore				1880-11-15	Baltimore, Maryland
		Roscoe Sheffield	Senior	D
		Sims Wylie	Sophomore	F

== Standings ==
1901–02 Collegiate ice hockey standings
	Intercollegiate							Overall					
	GP	W	L	T	PCT.	GF	GA	GP	W	L	T	GF	GA
Brown	5	2	3	0	.400	13	25	6	2	4	0	14	32
Columbia	4	0	4	0	.000	10	23	8	2	4	2	22	30
Cornell	1	0	1	0	.000	0	5	1	0	1	0	0	5
Harvard	6	3	3	0	.500	24	20	10	7	3	0	46	29
MIT	1	0	1	0	.000	0	5	6	3	2	1	15	14
Princeton	4	2	2	0	.500	11	14	9	5	3	1	29	22
Rensselaer	1	0	1	0	.000	1	4	1	0	1	0	1	4
Yale	7	7	0	0	1.000	45	10	17	11	5	1	75	47

1901–02 Intercollegiate Hockey Association standings
	Conference							Overall					
	GP	W	L	T	PTS	GF	GA	GP	W	L	T	GF	GA
Yale *	4	4	0	0	8	31	6	17	11	5	1	75	47
Harvard	4	3	1	0	6	20	11	10	7	3	0	46	29
Princeton	4	2	2	0	4	11	14	9	5	3	1	29	22
Brown	4	1	3	0	2	8	25	6	2	4	0	14	32
Columbia	4	0	4	0	0	10	23	8	2	4	2	22	30
* indicates conference champion

== Schedule and results ==
Date	Opponent	Site	Result	Record
Regular Season
December 12	at St. Nicholas Hockey Club*	St. Nicholas Rink • New York, New York	T 1–1	0–0–1
January 11	at Short Hills*	Short Hills, New Jersey	L 1–4	0–1–1
January 15	vs. Yale	St. Nicholas Rink • New York, New York	L 0–7	0–2–1 (0–1–0)
February 6	at Columbia	St. Nicholas Rink • New York, New York	W 5–1	1–2–1 (1–1–0)
February 12	at Kensington Hockey Club*	St. Nicholas Rink • New York, New York	W 5–1	2–2–1
February 13	vs. Brown	St. Nicholas Rink • New York, New York	W 3–0	3–2–1 (2–1–0)
February 20	at Verona Lake Hockey Team*	Montclair, New Jersey	W 7–1	4–2–1
February 28	at St. Nicholas Hockey Club*	St. Nicholas Rink • New York, New York	W 4–1	5–2–1
March 1	vs. Harvard	St. Nicholas Rink • New York, New York	L 3–6	5–3–1 (2–2–0)
*Non-conference game.
