= 1902–03 Columbia men's ice hockey season =

- Conference: T–2nd IHA
- Home ice: St. Nicholas Rink

Record
- Overall: 3–5–1
- Conference: 1–3–1
- Home: 2–3–1
- Neutral: 1–2–0

Coaches and captains
- Captain: William Duden

The 1902–03 Columbia men's ice hockey season was the 7th season of play for the program.

== Season ==
The team did not have a head coach but Charles Dana served as team manager.

Note: Columbia University adopted the Lion as its mascot in 1910.

== Roster ==
No.	Nat.	Player	Class	Pos	Height	Weight	DoB	Hometown	Previous team
		Albert J. Akin	Junior	F
		Farrand Benedict	Junior	D
		William Bode	Sophomore
		Walter Cook Jr.	Sophomore	F
		Harold Herman Duden	Graduate
		William Duden (C)	Junior	D
		Douglas McKee	Junior	F
		John Hecker		F
	(United States)	Rudolph L. von Bernuth	Junior	G			1883-12-18	New York, New York
		Arthur Wolff	Senior	C

== Standings ==
1902–03 Collegiate ice hockey standings
	Intercollegiate							Overall					
	GP	W	L	T	PCT.	GF	GA	GP	W	L	T	GF	GA
Brown	4	0	4	0	.000	2	20	6	1	5	0	9	23
Columbia	5	1	3	1	.300	15	17	9	3	5	1	21	28
Cornell	2	1	1	0	.500	4	2	2	1	1	0	4	2
Harvard	7	7	0	0	1.000	33	8	10	10	0	0	51	14
MIT	1	0	1	0	.000	3	4	1	0	1	0	3	4
Princeton	5	2	2	1	.500	14	12	11	5	5	1	44	40
Rensselaer	1	0	1	0	.000	1	2	1	0	1	0	1	2
Williams	1	1	0	0	1.000	2	1	3	2	1	0	9	11
Yale	8	4	4	0	.500	17	24	17	4	12	1	30	83

1902–03 Intercollegiate Hockey Association standings
	Conference								Overall					
	GP	W	L	T	PTS	GF	GA		GP	W	L	T	GF	GA
Harvard *	4	4	0	0	8	18	2		10	10	0	0	51	14
Yale	4	2	2	0	4	11	8		17	4	12	1	30	83
Columbia	4	2	2	0	4	12	14	†	9	3	5	1	21	28
Princeton	4	2	2	0	4	14	8	†	11	5	5	1	44	40
Brown	4	0	4	0	0	2	20		6	1	5	0	9	23
* indicates conference champion † Princeton's team disbanded before a tie with Columbia could be settled and was forced to forfeit the game.

== Schedule and results ==
Date	Opponent	Site	Result	Record
Regular Season
January 10	vs. St. Francis Xavier*	Clermont Avenue Skating Rink • Brooklyn, New York	W 2–0	1–0–0
January 14	Yale	St. Nicholas Rink • New York, New York	L 4–6	1–1–0 (0–1–0)
January 31	Harvard	St. Nicholas Rink • New York, New York	L 1–5	1–2–0 (0–2–0)
February 6	Brooklyn Crescents*	St. Nicholas Rink • New York, New York	L 2–9	1–3–0
February 7	Hackley School*	St. Nicholas Rink • New York, New York	W 2–0	2–3–0
February 11	Princeton	St. Nicholas Rink • New York, New York	T 2–2 †	2–3–1 (1–2–0)
February 14	Brown	St. Nicholas Rink • New York, New York	W 5–1	3–3–1 (2–2–0)
February 18	vs. New York Athletic Club*	St. Nicholas Rink • New York, New York	L 1–2	3–5–1
February 24	Yale*	St. Nicholas Rink • New York, New York (IHA Tiebreaker)	L 2–3	3–6–1
*Non-conference game.

† Because Princeton's team was disbanded they were forced to forfeit the overtime session to be played after the 18th of February. As a result Columbia finished in a tie with Yale for 2nd place in the conference, necessitating the game on February 24.
