= 1901–02 RPI men's ice hockey season =

- Conference: Independent

Record
- Overall: 0–1–0
- Conference: 0–1–0
- Home: 0–1–0

Coaches and captains
- Captain: Norman Taylor

The 1901–02 RPI men's ice hockey season was the inaugural season of play for the program.

== Season ==
RPI played its first intercollegiate game against Williams College at a rink just north of Troy, New York.

Note: Rensselaer's athletic teams were unofficially known as 'Cherry and White' until 1921 when the Engineers moniker debuted for the men's basketball team.

== Roster ==
No.	Nat.	Player	Class	Pos	Height	Weight	DoB	Hometown	Previous team
	(United States)	Norman Taylor (C)	Senior					Albany, New York

== Standings ==
1901–02 Collegiate ice hockey standings
	Intercollegiate							Overall					
	GP	W	L	T	PCT.	GF	GA	GP	W	L	T	GF	GA
Brown	5	2	3	0	.400	13	25	6	2	4	0	14	32
Columbia	4	0	4	0	.000	10	23	8	2	4	2	22	30
Cornell	1	0	1	0	.000	0	5	1	0	1	0	0	5
Harvard	6	3	3	0	.500	24	20	10	7	3	0	46	29
MIT	1	0	1	0	.000	0	5	6	3	2	1	15	14
Princeton	4	2	2	0	.500	11	14	9	5	3	1	29	22
Rensselaer	1	0	1	0	.000	1	4	1	0	1	0	1	4
Yale	7	7	0	0	1.000	45	10	17	11	5	1	75	47

== Schedule and results ==
Date	Opponent	Site	Result	Record
Regular Season
January 25	vs. Williams ^{†}	Cohoes, New York	L 1–4	0–1–0 (0–1–0)
*Non-conference game.

† It is unclear whether this was an officially sanctioned team from Williams or if it was just made up of students from Williams College.
