= Winter Garden at Exposition Hall =

Skating rink in Pittsburgh, Pennsylvania

The Winter Garden
- The Expo
- Interactive map of The Winter Garden
- Full name: The Winter Garden at Exposition Hall
- Location: Site of Point State Park, Pittsburgh, Pennsylvania; United States
- Coordinates: 40°26′30″N 80°00′43″W
- Owner: Western Pennsylvania Exposition Society
- Operator: City of Pittsburgh (1920–1951); Pittsburgh Exposition (1896-1919)
- Surface: Multi-surface (ice)
- Field size: 300 feet (91 m) × 140 feet (43 m)

Construction
- Groundbreaking: 1885
- Built: 1885-1889
- Opened: 1889 (Expositions)
- Renovated: 1916 (Renovated for Hockey)
- Closed: 1920
- Demolished: 1941 (Music Hall); 1942 (Machinery Hall); July 2, 1951 (Main Hall)
- Cost: $1,000,000 (USD) $600,000 (USD) (renovation)
- Architect: Joseph Stillburg
- Main contractors: Murphy & Hamilton; Marshall Foundry & Construction Company

Tenants
- Various local teams (1916-1920); Winter Garden hockey team (1915–1916)

The Winter Garden at Exposition Hall was a multi-purpose facility, located in Pittsburgh, Pennsylvania. It was designed by Joseph Stillburg and stood on the current site of Point State Park. The facility consisted of three buildings: Main Hall, Music Hall and Machinery Hall. The Exposition was originally intended as a place for social gatherings where ideas and goods could be freely exchanged; however, the facility later became Pittsburgh's premier indoor ice hockey rink.

== History ==
=== Origins ===
In 1885, Western Pennsylvania Exposition Society, commonly called the Pittsburgh Exposition Society, was organized. During this era international expositions, state and county fairs and municipal expositions were very common. In fact, the Exposition Society was an outgrowth of an association that conducted the earlier expositions on the city's North Shore, on the spot where Exposition Park, the home of the Pittsburgh Pirates until 1909, stood. The society was a non-profit-sharing organization, having been established by public-spirited citizens for the benefit of the community. The Pittsburgh Exposition, were determined to have a venue that offered the feel of a county fair with the mystique of a World's Fair. A year after the society formed, the Pittsburgh City Council approved the purchase of land at the city's Point, along the shore of the Allegheny River. Exposition lifetime memberships and popular subscriptions raised nearly $1 million to complete the facility's construction. The city then granted the organization a 50-year lease.

=== Expositions ===
The first exposition took place in September 1889 and was open to both Pittsburgh and out-of-state residents. The facility had a daily average attendance of 10,000 during the fall months; visitors were attracted to the automobile, poultry and trade shows, while others gathered to enjoy the best orchestras and bands in the nation. Victor Herbert and John Philip Sousa both played at the Exposition. Meanwhile, fashion shows from New York and Paris attracted high-society women, while free samples of balloons, popcorn and dairy products captured the attention of ordinary citizens. Finally, a roller coaster, Ferris wheel and merry-go-round helped lure the children of western Pennsylvania to the facility.

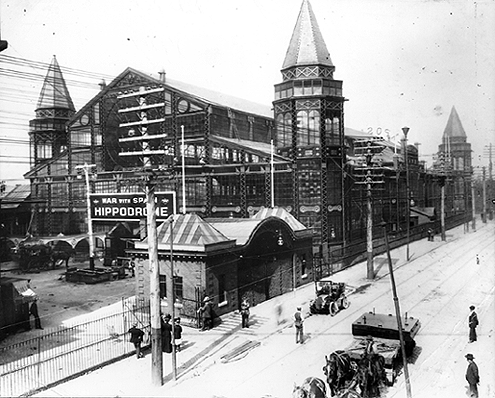
The Exposition in 1898

The complex had 100,000 square feet (9,300 m^{2}) of exhibit space, an art gallery and the Music Hall that held 5,500 patrons. People traveled from great distances to join the locals; many wealthy patrons traveled up the Mississippi and Ohio rivers to moor their houseboats along the Allegheny's shore behind the Exposition site. Over the years, the annual exhibitions were the most successful in the country.

However, disaster struck the Exposition in 1901, when the complex was destroyed by a fire on St. Patrick's Day. The fire was caused by wind-blown embers from a nearby stable fire. The blaze engulfed the great Main Hall, leaving Machinery Hall the only surviving building on the six-acre site. Most of the Exposition was rebuilt at a cost of $600,000 and included new versions of Machinery Hall, the Main Hall and the Music Hall. The new Main Hall was constructed of steel, stone and massive brick walls. The Main Hall's heavy doors were adorned with cut white stone and the interior was decorated and illuminated by 1,500 incandescent lights under a vaulted and girdered ceiling. However, by 1910, other cities that had been holding expositions dropped out of the field, but the Pittsburgh Exposition Society held on. Even while during the last decade, public interest in such affairs was declining, the society secured large attendance every year by increasing the facility's musical attractions by booking the greatest orchestras and bands of the country. The last exposition was held in the fall of 1916. On that occasion, the receipts fell off from the average of about $30,000, and the returns did not pay the expenses of the season. Over the next two years, hosting an exposition was deemed impossible, due to World War I and a polio epidemic.

=== Move to the ice ===
Around 1914, public interest in ice skating was growing in Pittsburgh and that interest served as the focus for converting the Main Hall into the Winter Garden. Hockey was a growing sport in Pittsburgh and had been played at the Duquesne Garden, which was located in the city's Oakland neighborhood. However ice time at the Gardens was scarce while the demand for hockey was growing.

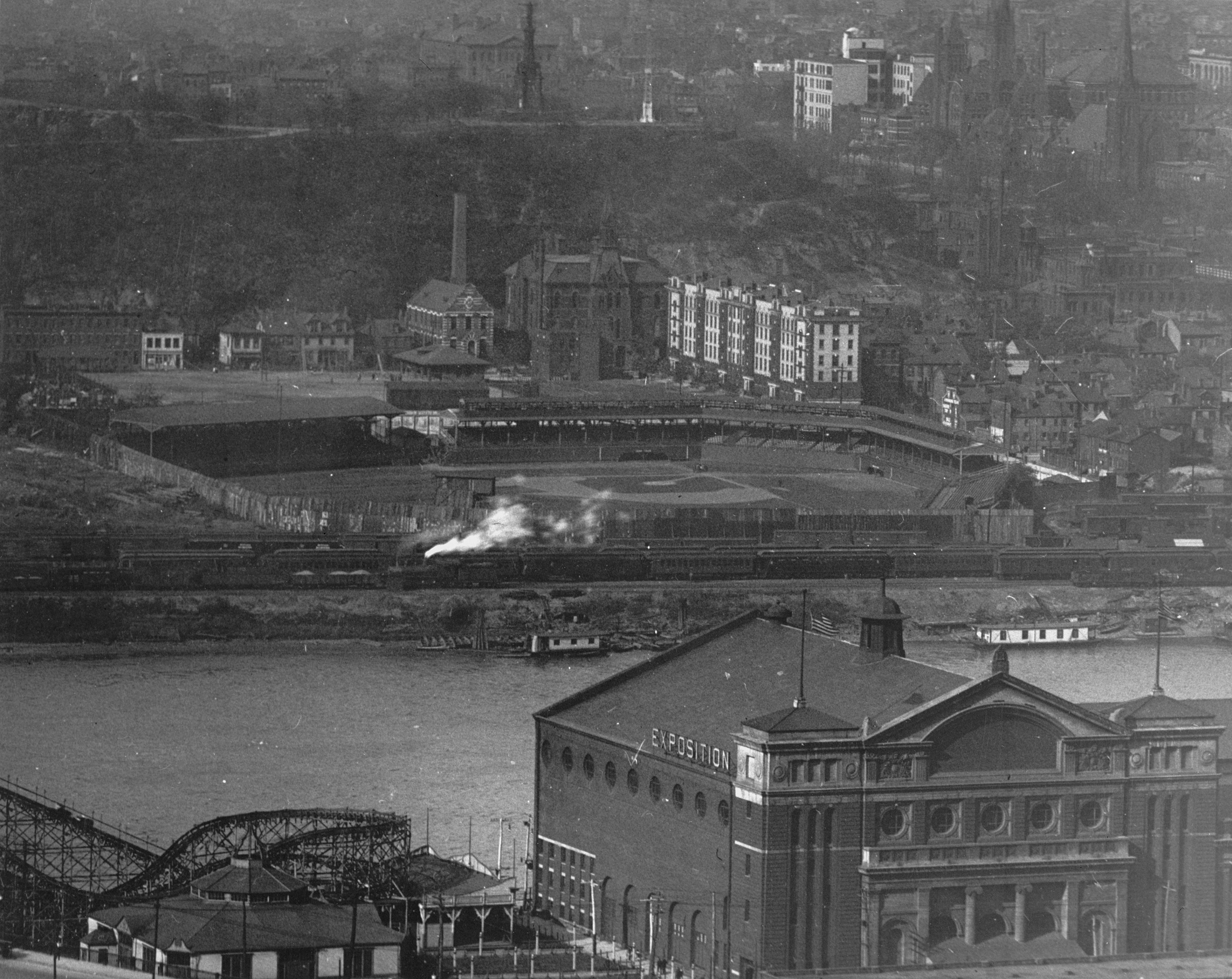
Exposition Hall, with its rollercoaster shown in 1915. In the background is Exposition Park, home of the Pittsburgh Pirates

In 1915, chiller pipes and concrete were added to the floor of the Main Hall to create an impressive ice surface. The Winter Garden used the latest technology to produce hard, dry ice. The refrigeration plant was located in Machinery Hall almost 500 feet away and circulated a brine solution through 125,000 feet of pipe below the ice surface. The ice-making system used the latestest technology and pumped an ice-making solution at a rate of 15,000 gallons every minute to produce a minus 30 temperature on the floor.

In 1915, Arthur Sixsmith became the manager of the Winter Garden's hockey team. The team was based at the Winter Garden. However, the team only lasted one season, before disbanding in 1916. Meanwhile, Roy Schooley, the manager of the Duquesne Garden, began putting together his "Duquesne Garden hockey team". A feud soon began between the two clubs. The Duquesne and Winter Garden teams each played out-of-town opponents, often on the same night, and in direct competition of one another. Soon after one of Pittsburgh's earliest women's league formed at the Winter Garden. The size of the playing surface used for the Exposition's hockey games was 300 feet (91 m) x 140 feet (43 m) and was bigger than today's international size rinks. By comparison, today's National Hockey League rinks measure 200 feet (61 m) x 85 feet (26 m). The increased size wore down visiting opponents and heavily favored the home teams. On January 23, 1916, the Winter Garden hockey team played a two-game series against the Sudbury All-Stars, who were considered to be one of the best teams in Canada. The Winter Garden team defeated Sudbury, 2–0, in the first game. During the opening game, the Sudbury players were reportedly overwhelmed by the size of the Garden's ice surface. However, the Winter Garden team would go on to drop the series' second game to Sudbury, 3–1.

On March 24, 1917, the biggest hockey match in the Winter Garden's history took place, featuring Hobey Baker. A star football and hockey player from Princeton, Baker and an all-star group of amateur hockey players from Philadelphia played against an all-star team from Pittsburgh's amateur leagues. The Philadelphia team would go on to defeat Pittsburgh in overtime by a score of 3–2, with Baker scoring all three Philadelphia goals. Baker's goal tally included the game winner in the third overtime period. However, this would be the final hockey game and goal of Baker's career. He later died in France during a routine military flight, weeks after World War I ended. The last local hockey match at the Winter Garden, was played in the spring of 1920.

=== Creation of Point State Park ===
The society, in March 1919, voted to accept $360,000 from the city and give up the remaining 17 years of its 50-year lease of the city ground on which the buildings were located. During those next 17 years, the buildings with the lease would revert to the city anyhow, but the sale would enable the Society to pay its debts. Any money left over was to be divided among the men who invested their money in the institution. Pittsburgh's mayor, Edward V. Babcock, negotiated for the purchase of the Society's rights, to lease the main buildings for a union trolley freight station, and to use machinery hall for a city garage and machine shop, while the music hall could still be used for conventions and mass meetings. The final transaction by the society was made that March, when the lifetime managers and members of the society met in the auditorium of the Chamber of Commerce and unanimously decided to sell the holdings to the city for no less than $360,000. Local businessman Henry J. Heinz was the last elected president of the society.

A final agreement of the sale of the Exposition property was reported in the April 9, 1920 edition of the Pittsburgh Post-Gazette; however, a transfer was never finalized. Pittsburgh city council agreed to lease and used the Expo property for the city's auto pound. The lease ended 20 years later in 1934. The Music Hall was demolished in 1941 and Machinery Hall was dismantled in 1942 to secure scrap metal for the war effort. The Main Hall was the last remaining building until 1951 when the structure was torn down to make way for the 37-acre (150,000 m^{2}) Point State Park.
