= Pittsburgh Victorias =

- City: Pittsburgh, Pennsylvania, United States
- League: Western Pennsylvania Hockey League
- Founded: 1902
- Operated: 1902–1904
- Home arena: Duquesne Garden
- Colors: Maroon, white

Championships
- Regular season titles: (1) 1903–04

The Pittsburgh Victorias were one of the earliest professional ice hockey teams. The club was based in Pittsburgh, Pennsylvania, United States, and were members of the Western Pennsylvania Hockey League, the first league to openly hire hockey players, from 1902 to 1904. The team folded in 1904, when the WPHL disbanded its teams to form the Pittsburgh Professionals and compete in the International Professional Hockey League.

== History ==
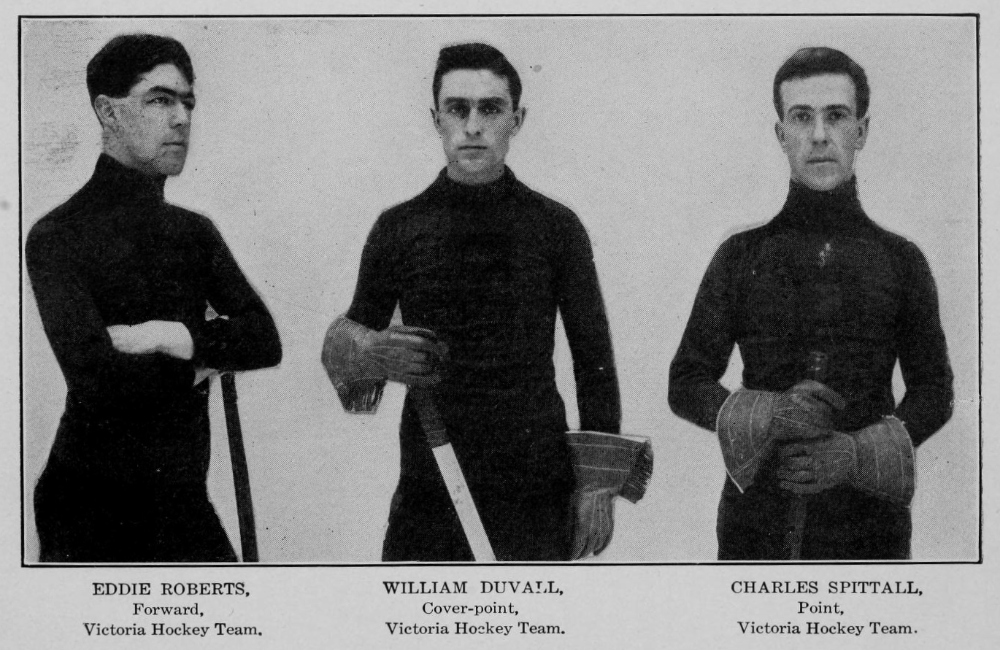
Pittsburgh Victorias players Eddie Roberts, William "Peg" Duval and Charles "Baldy" Spittal, wearing 1904–05 Pittsburgh Professionals uniforms

For the 1902–03 season, the Victorias were added to the WPHL making it a four team league. The team was made up of players from Ottawa, Ontario, enticed to come to Pittsburgh. The Victorias were able to add Stanley Cup winner Bruce Stuart to their team, giving the future Hall of Famer his start in professional hockey. That season, Stuart led the WPHL with 16 goals in his first pro season and was named to the First All-Star team. William Duval, the 1902 captain of the Ottawa Silver Seven, also made the trip to Pittsburgh and began his professional career with the Victorias. Ottawa's Harold "Chic" Henry, Charles Spittal and the Sixsmith brothers, Garnet and Arthur, also played for the Victorias. Arthur, the previous season, played on the Keystones' championship team. While Garnet would one day score 11 goals in a game in Pittsburgh, considered to be a record for the Duquesne Garden.

In 1904 the Victorias won the WPHL title and played Houghton, Michigan's Portage Lakes Hockey Club for the "American Championship" that year. The Victorias lost the three game series two games to one. The team disbanded later that year when the WPHL consolidated its players into the Pittsburgh Professionals and competed in the International Professional Hockey League. Several of the Victorias' players went on to play with the Professionals, such as William Duval, Ed Roberts, Arthur and Garnet Sixsmith and Charles Spittal.

== Prominent players ==
Victorias members of Hockey Hall of Fame:

- Bruce Stuart (1961)

== Notes ==
Preceded by Pittsburgh Bankers; 1902-03	WPHL Champions; 1903-04	Succeeded by Pittsburgh Bankers; 1907-08
