= 1901–02 WPHL season =

- League: Western Pennsylvania Hockey League
- Sport: Ice hockey
- Teams: 3

Regular season
- Season champions: Pittsburgh Keystones (1st title)

Seasons
- 1900–01 1902–03

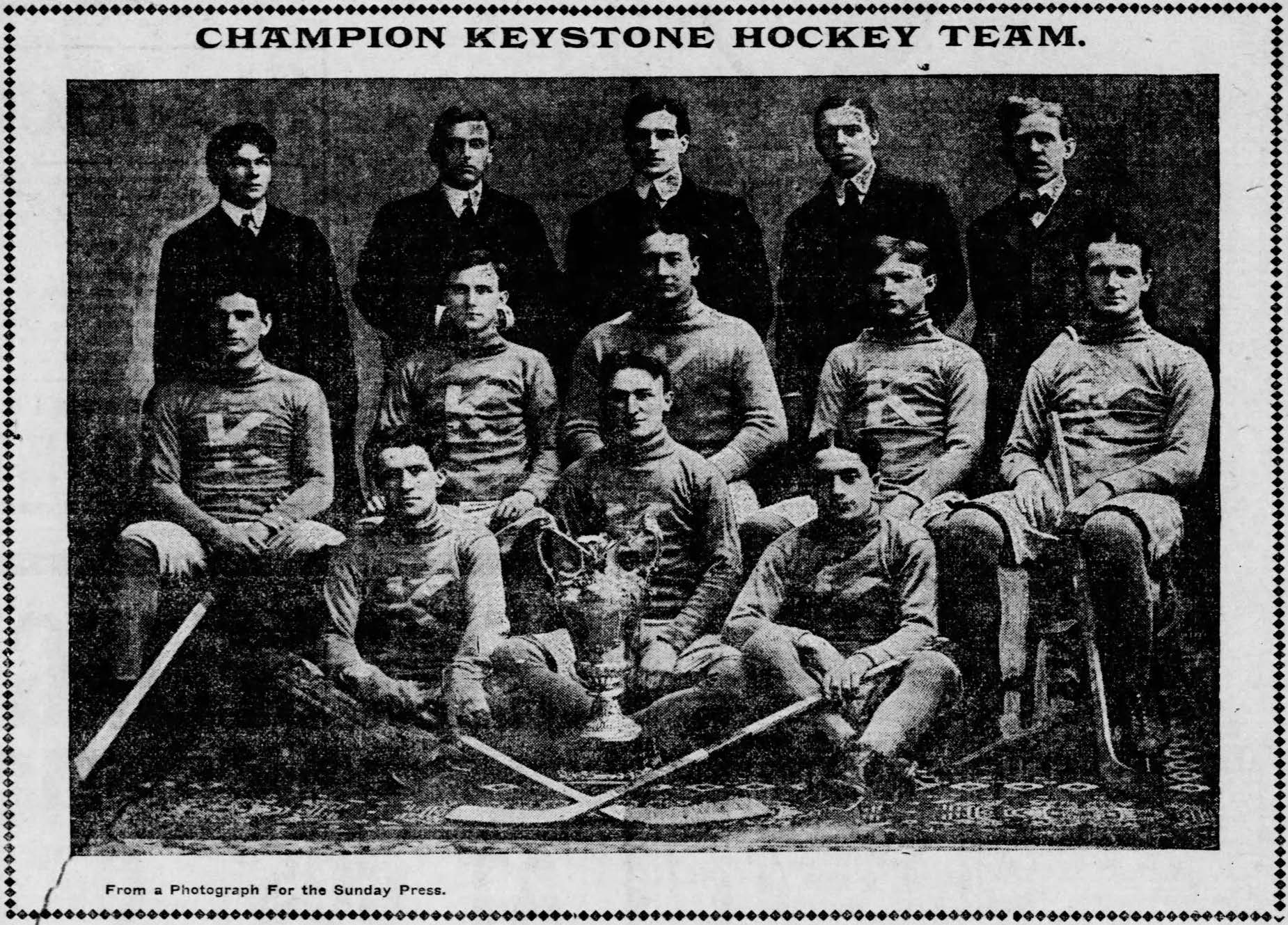
Keystones, league champions

The 1901–02 WPHL season was the fifth season of operation for the Western Pennsylvania Hockey League. Three Pittsburgh-area teams competed in the season, in which all games were played at the Duquesne Garden. The season concluded with the Pittsburgh Keystones having the best record in the league and being named league champions. It would be the team's only league title.

In the summer of 1902 Keystones' player Harry Peel admitted that he was paid $35 a week to play in the league. According to Peel "[The Keystones] make no bones whatever about paying men. If they do not pay them, they give them fake positions." Peel was later suspended by the Ontario Hockey Association and his appeal was rejected on December 10, 1903, and again on November 30, 1904. However, by the 1902–03 season the WPHL, was known as a fully professional league.

== Season ==
=== Final standings ===
Note GP = Games Played, W = Wins, L = Losses, T = Ties, GF = Goals For, GA = Goals Against, PTS = Points

Team	GP	W	L	T	GF	GA	PTS
Pittsburgh Keystones	14	9	5	0	42	32	18
Pittsburgh Athletic Club	14	8	6	0	46	28	16
Pittsburgh Bankers	14	4	10	0	27	55	8

=== Results ===
Month	Day	Team	Score	Team	Score
1900
November	29	Bankers	3	Keystones	2
December	3	Keystones	4	Pittsburgh AC	3
December	6	Pittsburgh AC	5	Bankers	3
December	10	Bankers	5	Keystones	3
December	13	Keystones	5	Pittsburgh AC	1
December	17	Bankers	3	Pittsburgh AC	0
December	24	Keystones	3	Pittsburgh AC	2
December	27	Bankers	2	Pittsburgh AC	1
December	31	Keystones	2	Bankers	1
1901
January	14	Pittsburgh AC	5	Bankers	1
January	17	Pittsburgh AC	3	Keystones	2
January	21	Keystones	6	Bankers	2
January	28	Keystones	1	Pittsburgh AC	0
January	31	Keystones	3	Bankers	1
February	4	Pittsburgh AC	1	Bankers	0
February	11	Pittsburgh AC	3	Keystones	2
February	18	Keystones	4	Bankers	1
February	25	Pittsburgh AC	7	Bankers	1
February	28	Keystones	5	Bankers	3
March	4	Pittsburgh AC	4	Keystones	0
March	7	Pittsburgh AC	11	Bankers	1

Preceded by 1900–01	WPHL seasons 1901–02	Succeeded by 1902–03
