= Harry Peel (ice hockey) =

Canadian ice hockey player

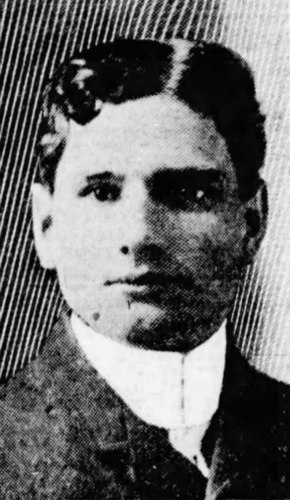
- Born: June 21, 1879 London, Ontario, Canada
- Died: November 28, 1944 (aged 65)
- Position: Cover point
- Played for: Pittsburgh Keystones

Harold William Peel (June 21, 1879 – November 28, 1944) was a Canadian early professional ice hockey player with the Pittsburgh Keystones of the Western Pennsylvania Hockey League. He was a member of the Keystones 1902 WPHL championship team.

== Biography ==
Harry Peel was one of the first openly professional hockey players. In 1902 he disclosed that he was paid $35 a week to play for the Pittsburgh Keystones. This was a violation of the team's amateur status. As a result, both Canadian and U.S. officials disallowed all amateur teams to play against the Keystones and Peel's amateur status was revoked by the Ontario Hockey Association. He issued two appeals that were rejected on December 10, 1903 and again on November 30, 1904.

However, professional hockey expanded and the WPHL embraced its new professional status. As a result, the league expanded to four teams by adding the Pittsburgh Victorias, and openly enticed the best talent it could, including future Hockey Hall of Fame members Hod and Bruce Stuart from the Quebec Bulldogs, Alf Smith from the Ottawa Hockey Club and Riley Hern from the Stratford Legionnaires.

Peel died in November 1944 and is buried at Mount Pleasant Cemetery and Crematorium in his hometown of London, Ontario.
