= 1903–04 WPHL season =

- League: Western Pennsylvania Hockey League
- Sport: Ice hockey
- Teams: 4

Regular season
- Season champions: Pittsburgh Victorias (1st title)

Seasons
- 1902–03 1904–05 (IPHL)

The 1903–04 WPHL season was the seventh season of operation for the Western Pennsylvania Hockey League. Four Pittsburgh-area teams competed in the season, in which all games were played at the Duquesne Garden. However, the Pittsburgh Keystones withdrew from the league on January 17, 1904. The season concluded with the Pittsburgh Victorias having the best record in the league and being named league champions. It would be the team's only league title. The season also marked the final WPHL season until 1907 as the city formed the Pittsburgh Professionals a professional club to compete in the International Professional Hockey League.

== Season ==
=== Final standings ===
Note GP = Games Played, W = Wins, L = Losses, T = Ties, GF = Goals For, GA = Goals Against, PTS = Points

Team	GP	W	L	T	GF	GA	PTS
Pittsburgh Victorias	13	10	3	0	56	23	20
Pittsburgh Bankers	15	8	7	0	45	45	16
Pittsburgh Athletic Club	14	4	10	0	44	62	8
Pittsburgh Keystones †	6	2	4	0	15	30	4

† The Keystones withdrew from the league on January 17, 1904

=== Results ===
Month	Day	Team	Score	Team	Score
1903
December	1	Pittsburgh AC	6	Bankers	1
December	3	Victorias	6	Keystones	1
December	8	Victorias	5	Bankers	1
December	10	Keystones	6	Pittsburgh AC	4
December	15	Bankers	3	Keystones	2
December	17	Victorias	9	Pittsburgh AC	2
December	22	Bankers	6	Pittsburgh AC	0
December	24	Victorias	5	Keystones	0
1904
January	5	Bankers	3	Victorias	1
January	8	Keystones	5	Pittsburgh AC	4
January	12	Bankers	8	Keystones	1
January	15	Victorias	5	Pittsburgh AC	1
January	19	Bankers	3	Pittsburgh AC	2
January	22	Bankers	2	Victorias	1
January	26	Victorias	6	Pittsburgh AC	5
January	29	Victorias	5	Bankers	1
February	2	Pittsburgh AC	5	Bankers	4
February	9	Pittsburgh AC	4	Victorias	2
February	16	Victorias	5	Bankers	2
February	19	Bankers	5	Pittsburgh AC	3
February	23	Victorias	4	Pittsburgh AC	1
February	26	Victorias	2	Bankers	0
March	4	Pittsburgh AC	4	Bankers	2
March	8	Bankers	4	Pittsburgh AC	3

Preceded by 1902–03	WPHL seasons 1903–04	Succeeded by 1904–05 (IPHL)
