= 1902–03 WPHL season =

- League: Western Pennsylvania Hockey League
- Sport: Ice hockey
- Teams: 4

Regular season
- Season champions: Pittsburgh Bankers (1st title)

Seasons
- 1901–02 1903–04

The 1902–03 WPHL season was the sixth season of operation for the Western Pennsylvania Hockey League. This was the first season whereby the league and its teams were recognized as professional, making it the first professional ice hockey league. To fill their team the Pittsburgh Athletic Club lured players from Canada with promises of high-paid employment and small cash incentives, which was around $30 a week.

Four Pittsburgh-area teams competed in the season, in which all games were played at the Duquesne Garden. The Pittsburgh Victorias were added to the WPHL making it a four team league. The team was made up of players from Ottawa, that were enticed to come to Pittsburgh. The Victorias were able to add Stanley Cup winner Bruce Stuart to their team, giving the future Hall of Famer his start in professional hockey. That season, Stuart led the WPHL with 16 goals in his first pro season and was named to the First All-Star team. The season concluded with the Pittsburgh Bankers having the best record in the league and being named league champions. It would be the team's first league title.

== Season ==
=== Final standings ===
Note GP = Games Played, W = Wins, L = Losses, T = Ties, GF = Goals For, GA = Goals Against, PTS = Points

Team	GP	W	L	T	GF	GA	PTS
Pittsburgh Bankers	14	10	3	1	59	18	21
Pittsburgh Athletic Club	13	7	5	1	36	32	15
Pittsburgh Victorias	14	7	7	0	47	40	14
Pittsburgh Keystones	13	2	11	0	19	71	4

=== Results ===
Month	Day	Team	Score	Team	Score
1902
November	28	Bankers	4	Victorias	1
December	2	Pittsburgh AC	2	Keystones	0
December	5	Pittsburgh AC	1	Bankers	1
December	9	Victorias	7	Keystones	1
December	12	Victorias	3	Pittsburgh AC	2
December	16	Bankers	2	Keystones	1
December	19	Victorias	2	Bankers	1
December	23	Pittsburgh AC	4	Keystones	1
1903
January	6	Pittsburgh AC	4	Victorias	2
January	9	Pittsburgh AC	3	Bankers	2
January	13	Bankers	4	Keystones	0
January	16	Victorias	7	Keystones	1
January	20	Victorias	4	Bankers	1
January	23	Pittsburgh AC	5	Keystones	3
January	27	Pittsburgh AC	2	Keystones	1
February	3	Bankers	4	Pittsburgh AC	2
February	6	Bankers	4	Pittsburgh AC	3
February	10	Bankers	13	Keystones	0
February	13	Victorias	3	Pittsburgh AC	2
February	17	Keystones	4	Victorias	2
February	20	Bankers	1	Victorias	0
February	24	Bankers	10	Keystones	1
March	3	Victorias	11	Keystones	3
March	6	Pittsburgh AC	6	Victorias	3
March	10	Bankers	7	Victorias	0
March	13	Bankers	5	Pittsburgh AC	0
March	17	Keystones	3	Victorias	2

Preceded by 1901–02	WPHL seasons 1902–03	Succeeded by 1903–04
