= Pittsburgh Bankers =

- City: Pittsburgh, Pennsylvania
- League: Western Pennsylvania Hockey League
- Operated: 1899–1904, 1907–1909
- Home arena: Duquesne Garden
- Colors: Various
- Owner: Various local banks

Championships
- Regular season titles: (2) 1902–03, 1907–08

The Pittsburgh Bankers were one of the earliest professional ice hockey clubs. The club was based in Pittsburgh, Pennsylvania and was a member of the Western Pennsylvania Hockey League, the first league to openly hire hockey players, from 1899–1904 and 1907–1909. The team played all of its games at Duquesne Garden, and was involved in the first known trade of professional hockey players.

== History ==
=== Origins ===
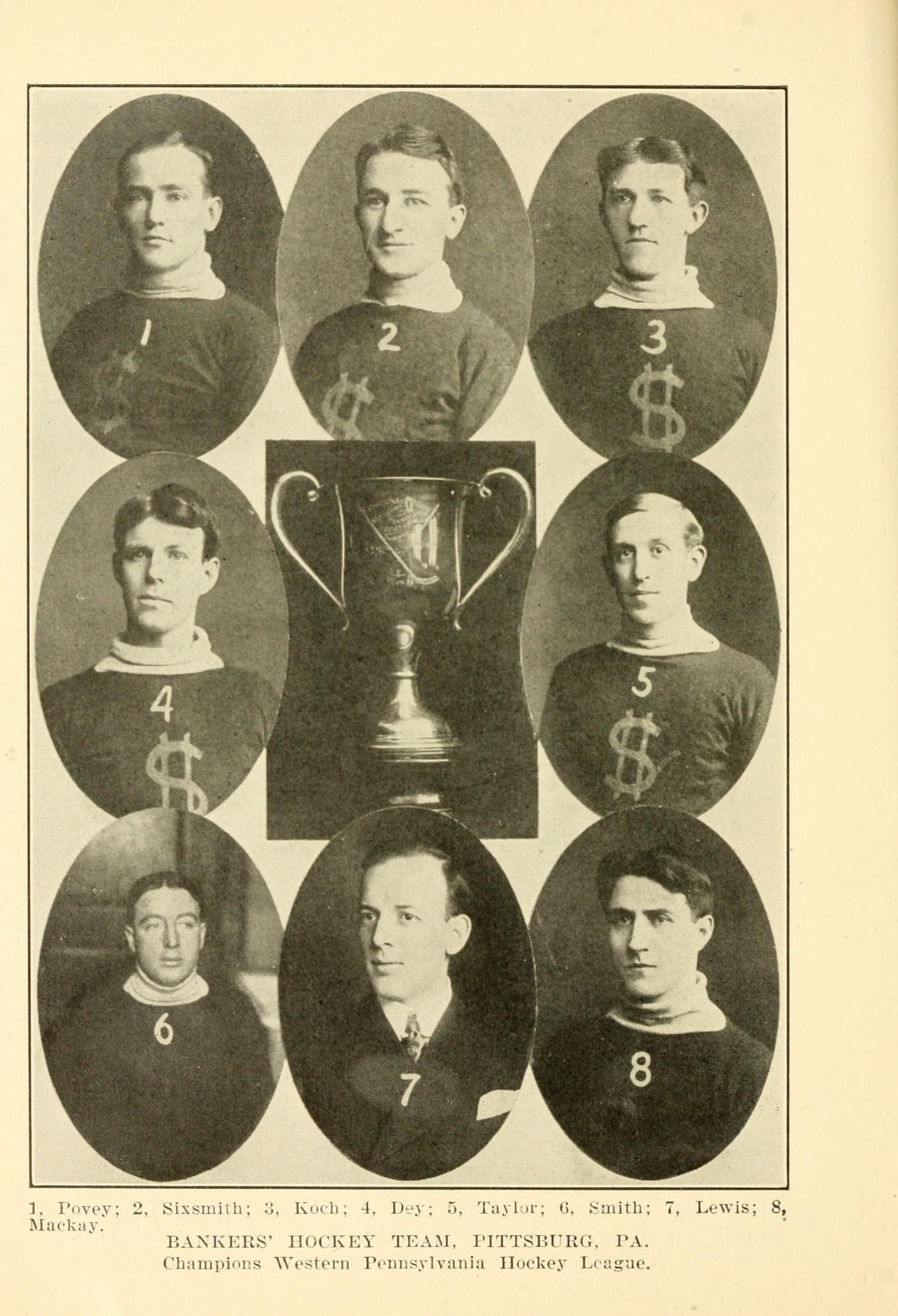
1908 Pittsburgh Bankers, WPHL Champions

In October 1899, the Western Pennsylvania Hockey League, which had comprised only three teams in its previous season of 1898–99, took applications for a fourth member for the upcoming 1899–1900 season. Applicants included Carnegie Athletic Club of Braddock, Homestead Library & Athletic Club, Keystone Bicycle Club, and the Bankers' Association of Pittsburgh. The team representing the Bankers' Association won admission and on November 28, 1899 played its first league game.

=== First title: 1902 ===
In 1902, the Bankers signed Hod Stuart to a professional contract; this was disputed between the Bankers and the Pittsburgh Victorias, who also claimed him. Eventually the Bankers won the dispute and kept Stuart, who was considered, in certain hockey circles, to be the “greatest hockey player in the world." Hod was offered a salary of US$15–20 per week, plus steady income from a day job in Pittsburgh. Stuart scored seven goals and had eight assists and was named the best cover-point in the league in 1903. The Bankers claimed their first WPHL title that season and faced off against the Portage Lakes Hockey Club, located in Houghton, Michigan, for the title of top professional team in the United States. The winner of that series is unclear since Portage Lakes would win two of the four games and tie a third and the Bankers claimed the edge in total goals, 11–6. Another of the era's stars, Charlie Liffiton, joined the Bankers in 1902 to help the club win its first title. Over his two seasons with the club, Liffiton reportedly scored three goals in four playoff matches.

=== Consolidated into the IPHL ===
The following season, the Bankers saw their star player, Hod Stuart, leave the team to join the Portage Lakes Hockey Club. In fact as Portage Lakes continued to play professional exhibition games, the team raided all of the WPHL teams for their key players. The Bankers' Charlie Liffiton was offered $1350 to play for the Portage Lakes club for the remainder of the season, making him the era's highest paid player. The WPHL and the Bankers disappeared for the following season so that the WPHL could consolidate into the Pittsburgh Professionals and begin playing in the International Professional Hockey League. The idea for the new league was the idea of James R. Dee, a Houghton businessman, who came up with the idea after watching the Bankers and Portage Lakes play in 1904. Several Bankers' players, such as Lorne Campbell and Hod Stuart, played for the Pittsburgh Professionals. Meanwhile, other Bankers players, like Charlie Liffiton, played for Portage Lakes.

=== Revival and quick demise ===
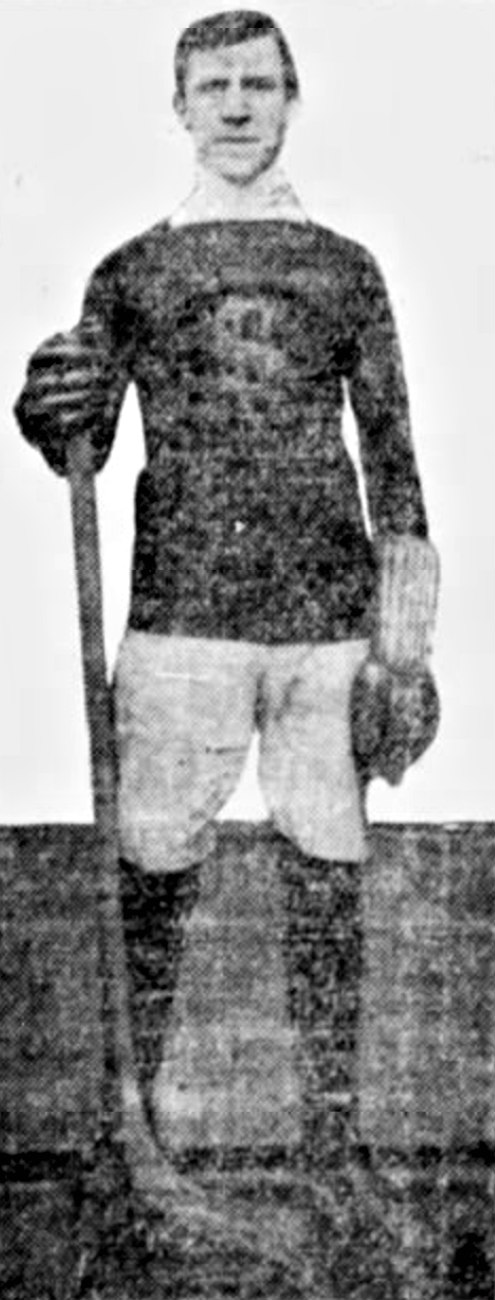
Bert Bennett.

The WPHL, along with the Pittsburgh Bankers was revived for the 1907–08 season, once the IPHL folded. During that season, the Bankers were involved in what might have been the first trades of professional hockey players. The Bankers traded Dutch Koch to Lyceum for Harry Burgoyne in December 1907, and in early January, reacquired Koch from Lyceum in exchange for Fred Young. A bigger deal took place on January 27, 1908, when the Bankers sent Joseph Donnelly and Bert Bennett to the Pittsburgh Pirates for Jim MacKay, Edgar Dey and Dunc Taylor. On January 31 the Pirates would also acquire Gordon McGuire from the Bankers through a separate purchase. The Bankers would go on to win their second league title in 1907–08. The Bankers then played a "World's Series" with the Montreal Wanderers. The Wanderers won the series two games to one.

The following season saw future Stanley Cup winner Skene Ronan made his professional hockey debut with the Bankers, however Ronan would later break his contract to leave the team and play with the Toronto Professionals. Meanwhile, future Hall of Famer Alf Smith returned to the Western Pennsylvania Hockey League and played for the Bankers and the Duquesne Athletic Club before he was suspended from the two teams for rough play.

However the defection of star Bankers players such as Ronan, Tommy Smith, Harry Smith and Edgar Dey were now common in the WPHL. The newly revived league could no longer rely on salaries as novelty to attract Canadian talent, since professionalism had spread into Canada. Many players signed up, particularly since the WPHL played on Duquesne Garden's artificial ice and was not dependent on cold weather to provide a naturally frozen surface; however as winter began and Canadian rinks became available, the players would just flock north to teams closer to home. This jumping affected all of the league's teams. Once the Pittsburgh Lyceum team folded on December 23, it was decided to discontinue the WPHL after the season. The championship of the final season came down to the last game between the Bankers and the Duquesne Athletic Club on February 6, 1909. The D.A.C. won the game 4–2, making them champions and preventing the Bankers from claiming a third WPHL title.

== Prominent players ==
The following members of the Bankers became enshrined in the Hockey Hall of Fame:

- Alf Smith (1962)
- Tommy Smith (1973)
- Hod Stuart (1945)

== Logo and uniforms ==
Starting with their first season of 1899–1900, the Bankers wore sweaters marked with a yellow dollar sign. The Pittsburgh Post referred to the team at points during the next two seasons as the "blue and old gold" and "wearers of the gold and blue". On the day of the 1903–04 season opener, it was reported that the team's new uniforms would be "all blue with the letter B in white". When the WPHL was revived in late 1907 after three seasons of inactivity, the Bankers came back wearing olive green jerseys with a gold dollar sign on the chest. A game report in late 1908, during the team's and the league's last season, referred to the Bankers as red and white.

Preceded by Pittsburgh Keystones; 1901–02; Pittsburgh Victorias; 1903–04	WPHL Champions; 1902–03 1907–08	Succeeded by Pittsburgh Victorias; 1903–04; Duquesne Athletic Club; 1908–09
