= Pittsburgh Keystones (ice hockey) =

- City: Pittsburgh, Pennsylvania
- League: W. Penn Hockey League
- Operated: 1900–1904
- Home arena: Duquesne Garden
- Colors: Blue, White

Championships
- Regular season titles: (1) 1901–02

The Pittsburgh Keystones were a semi-professional ice hockey club, located in Pittsburgh, Pennsylvania and was a member of the Western Pennsylvania Hockey League, the first league to openly hire hockey players, from 1900–1904. The team played all of its games at the Duquesne Garden, and was involved in allowing Harry Peel become the first admitted professional hockey player in 1902.

== History ==
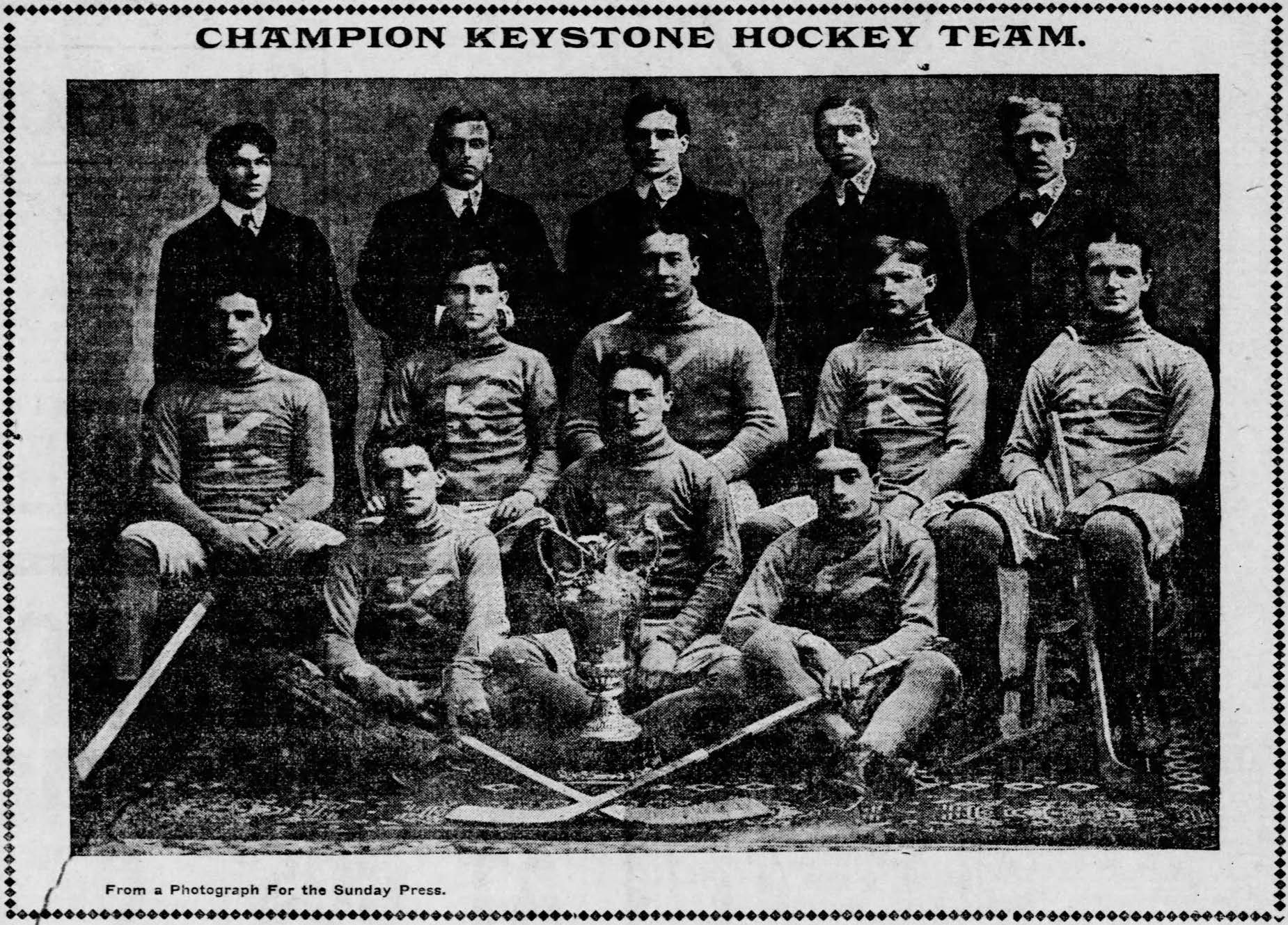
1901–02 Keystones, WPHL champions

The Keystones' history can be traced to the Keystone Bicycle Club, which was organized in 1879. The bicycle club attempted to branch into hockey in 1899 when it applied to be the new member of the Western Pennsylvania Hockey League, which was expanding from three to four teams. Although the Pittsburgh Bankers were admitted instead, the Keystone club had only to wait another year before the Western University of Pennsylvania withdrew from the league, allowing the Keystones to fill the vacancy. In forming its team the Keystones heavily recruited from Canada, a practice that was soon copied by the other teams in the WPHL.

The Keystone club made an auspicious debut by beating the two-time defending champion Pittsburgh Athletic Club in the opening game of the WPHL's 1900–01 season. Keystone continually strengthened its team during the season but finished second to the PAC, which did not lose another league game on its way to a third consecutive title. Aside from league play, the WPHL teams also played exhibition games against some of the best amateur teams from North America.

During the 1901–02 season, goaltender Riley Hern, a future member of the Hockey Hall of Fame, began his professional career with the Keystones. In his first season, Hern led the league in victories, with nine in 14 games and was named to the WPHL All-Star Team. Joining Hern on the team in 1901 was Arthur Sixsmith who moved to Pittsburgh and turned professional with the Keystones. The Keystones went on to win the 1901–02 WPHL championship title, finally ending the reign of the Pittsburgh Athletic Club. However, the Keystones reversed their fortunes in the following season, with a last-place finish and with Hern this time leading the league in losses.

=== First admitted professional player ===
In the summer of 1902 Harry Peel, a Keystones player in 1901–02, admitted that he was paid $35 a week to play in the so-called amateur league and so no amateur teams would play against these teams again without being suspended by either Canadian or U.S. officials. According to Peel "[The Keystones] make no bones whatever about paying men. If they do not pay them, they give them fake positions." Peel was later suspended by the Ontario Hockey Association and his appeal was rejected on December 10, 1903 and again on November 30, 1904. However, by the 1902–03 season the WPHL was known as a fully professional league.

=== Decline ===
The next season, the Portage Lakes Hockey Club of Houghton, Michigan began a professional league which continued to play professional exhibition game against the WPHL's Pittsburgh Bankers. However the exposure given by playing Portage Lakes raised the profiles of some of the Pittsburgh players, who were lured away after the season for the promise of better pay in Michigan. The team soon raided Pittsburgh’s teams for top players like Riley Hern and Bruce Stuart. This led the Keystones to withdraw from the league on January 17, 1904. Their players were then redistributed among the three other WPHL teams.

== Prominent Players ==
Keystones players inducted into the Hockey Hall of Fame:

- Riley Hern (1963)

Preceded by Pittsburgh Athletic Club; 1900-01	WPHL Champions; 1901-02	Succeeded by Pittsburgh Bankers; 1902-03
