= List of Viviz live performances =

Viviz live performances
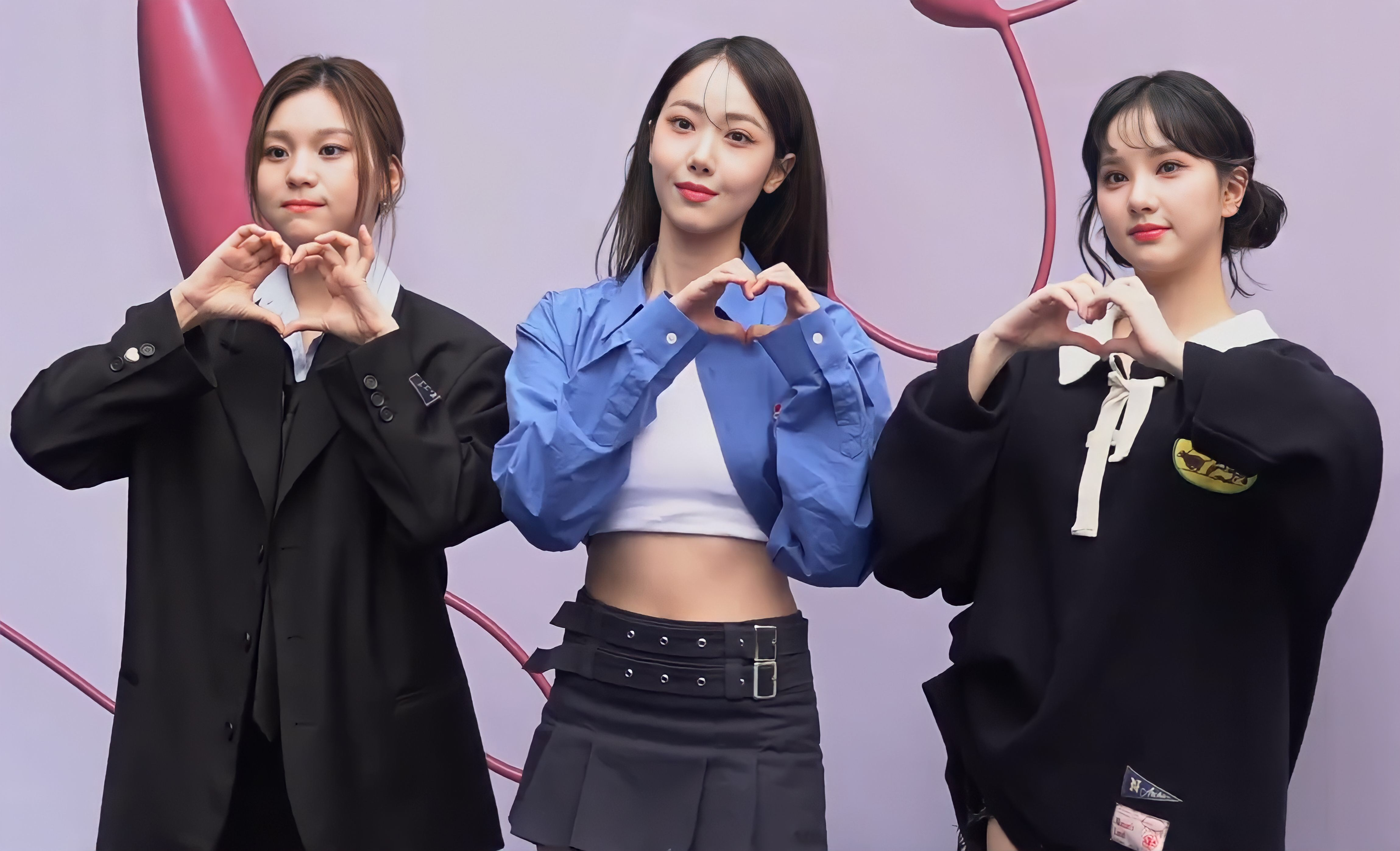
- Viviz in 2023
- Concert tours: 2

South Korean girl group Viviz have announced their second world concert tour, having performed in one world concert tour, one fan meeting and a series of festivals since their debut in 2022. Viviz consists of former GFriend members Eunha, SinB, and Umji, who previously performed on concert tours throughout Asia during their time as a group.

== V.hind: Love and Tears ==
V.hind: Love and Tears
- Tour by Viviz
- Promotional poster for the Seoul concerts
- Associated album: Various
- Start date: June 1, 2024
- End date: September 28, 2024
- No. of shows: 7 in Asia; 21 in North America; 28 Total

Viviz concert chronology
- V.hind: Love and Tears (2024); New Legacy (2025)

V.hind: Love and Tears was the first concert tour headlined by South Korean girl group Viviz. The tour began on June 1, 2024, in Seoul, South Korea and concluded on September 28, 2024, in Osaka, Japan. The Seoul dates were announced first, on May 2, 2024, with dates in Taipei, Hong Kong and the United States announced a few days later. Later on, the Japan dates were announced on August 14, 2024.

=== Shows ===
List of concerts, showing date, city, country and venue
| Date (2024) | City | Country | Venue |
|---|---|---|---|
| June 1 | Seoul | South Korea | KBS Hall |
| June 2 | Seoul | South Korea | KBS Hall |
| June 9 | Taipei | Taiwan | Taipei International Convention Center |
| June 15 | Bangkok | Thailand | MCC Hall The Mall Lifestore Bangkae |
| July 5 | Hong Kong | China | AsiaWorld-Expo, Runway 11 |
| July 13 | Atlanta | United States | Alliance Theatre |
| July 14 | Charlotte | United States | Dale F. Halton Theater |
| July 16 | Washington, D.C. | United States | Atlas Performing Arts Center |
| July 17 | Philadelphia | United States | Temple Performing Arts Center |
| July 19 | Boston | United States | Huntington Theatre Company |
| July 20 | New York City | United States | Queens Theatre in the Park |
| July 22 | Pittsburgh | United States | Kelly-Strayhorn Theater |
| July 23 | Columbus | United States | The King of Clubs |
| July 25 | Detroit | United States | The Crofoot Ballroom |
| July 27 | Louisville | United States | Art Sanctuary |
| July 28 | Nashville | United States | Riverside Revival |
| July 30 | Indianapolis | United States | Basile Theatre at the Historic Athenaeum |
| July 31 | Chicago | United States | Athenaeum Center |
| August 2 | Minneapolis | United States | Granada Theater |
| August 4 | Kansas City | United States | Gem Theater |
| August 6 | Oklahoma City | United States | Hudson Performance Hall |
| August 7 | Dallas | United States | Coppell Arts Center |
| August 8 | San Antonio | United States | Vibes Event Center |
| August 10 | Phoenix | United States | Stage West at Herberger Theater Center |
| August 12 | Los Angeles | United States | Downtown Palace Theater |
| August 14 | San Jose | United States | Montgomery Theater |
| September 26 | Yokohama | Japan | KT Zepp Yokohama |
| September 28 | Osaka | Japan | Zepp Osaka Bayside |

== New Legacy ==
New Legacy
- Tour by Viviz
- Associated album: Various
- Start date: July 5, 2025
- End date: November 9, 2025
- No. of shows: 8 in Asia; 17 in North America; 2 in Oceania; 27 Total

Viviz concert chronology
- V.hind: Love and Tears (2024); New Legacy (2025)

New Legacy was the second concert tour headlined by South Korean girl group Viviz. The tour began on July 5, 2025, in Seoul, South Korea and concluded on November 9, 2025, in Sydney, Australia. Eight shows dates were announced first, on May 28, 2025, the announcement also further teased more cities to come. Later on, the Malaysia and North America dates were announced on July 29, 2025.

=== Shows ===
List of concerts, showing date, city, country and venue
| Date (2025) | City | Country | Venue |
|---|---|---|---|
| July 5 | Seoul | South Korea | Olympic Hall |
| July 6 | Seoul | South Korea | Olympic Hall |
| September 3 | Atlanta | United States | Ray Charles Performing Arts Center |
| September 4 | Charlotte | United States | Dale F. Halton Theater |
| September 6 | Philadelphia | United States | Temple Performing Arts Center |
| September 7 | New York City | United States | LaGuardia Performing Arts Center |
| September 9 | Boston | United States | Cutler Majestic Theatre |
| September 11 | Montreal | Canada | Rialto Theatre |
| September 14 | Toronto | Canada | Chrysalis Theatre |
| September 16 | Columbus | United States | McCoy Center for the Arts |
| September 17 | Detroit | United States | Michael A. Guido Theater |
| September 18 | Chicago | United States | Athenaeum Theatre |
| September 20 | Minneapolis | United States | Ted Mann Concert Hall |
| September 22 | Kansas City | United States | Gem Theater |
| September 25 | Dallas | United States | Irving Arts Center |
| September 26 | Houston | United States | Bayou Theater |
| September 28 | San Antonio | United States | Palo Alto College Performing Arts Center |
| September 30 | Phoenix | United States | The Madison Center for the Arts |
| October 2 | Los Angeles | United States | Los Angeles Theatre |
| October 9 | Tokyo | Japan | Zepp Haneda |
| October 11 | Osaka | Japan | Zepp Namba |
| October 18 | Hong Kong | China | AXA Dreamland, Go Park |
| October 19 | Hong Kong | China | AXA Dreamland, Go Park |
| October 25 | Kuala Lumpur | Malaysia | Idea Live Arena |
| November 2 | Taipei | Taiwan | Taipei International Convention Center |
| November 6 | Melbourne | Australia | Festival Hall |
| November 9 | Sydney | Australia | Sydney Town Hall |

== Festivals ==
| Event | Date | City | Country | Venue | Ref. |
|---|---|---|---|---|---|
| KCON 2022 Premiere Seoul | May 7, 2022 | Seoul | South Korea | CJ ENM Center | |
| B.N.F Festival | June 4, 2022 | Seoul | South Korea | Olympic Park, Seoul | |
| K-POP Festa | June 18, 2022 | Nur Sultan | Kazakhstan | Kazakhstan Central Concert Hall | |
| MIK Festival | July 30, 2022 | London | United Kingdom | Southwark Park | |
| KCON 2022 Japan | October 14, 2022 | Tokyo | Japan | Ariake Arena | |
| Popstival | October 21, 2022 | Manila | The Philippines | Cultural Center of the Philippines Complex | |
| 2023 Show Taoyuan New Year's Eve | December 31, 2022 | Taoyuan | Taiwan | HSR Taoyuan Station Plaza | |
| We Bridge Music Festival | April 22, 2023 | Las Vegas | United States | Michelob Ultra Arena | |
| KCON 2023 Japan | May 13, 2023 | Chiba | Japan | Makuhari Messe | |
| KCON 2024 Hong Kong | March 31, 2024 | Hong Kong | China | AsiaWorld–Expo | |
| NEXT GENERATION LIVE ARENA 2024 | April 6–7, 2024 | Yokohama | Japan | Pia Arena MM | |
| Waterbomb Festival | August 24, 2024 | Singapore | | Siloso Beach, Sentosa | |
| Motion IME Festival 2024 | December 8, 2024 | Jakarta | Indonesia | Gambir Expo | |
| Waterbomb Festival | February 23, 2025 | Manila | The Philippines | Quirino Grandstand | |
| Osaka-Kansai World Expo 2025 'Korea Day' M Concert | May 13, 2025 | Osaka | Japan | Expo Arena "Matsuri" | |
| 2025 MIXPOP CONCERT | May 18, 2025 | Taipei | Taiwan | Taipei International Convention Center | |
| 2025 Weverse Con Festival | May 31, 2025 | Incheon | South Korea | Inspire Arena | |
| 2026 Kaohsiung Sakura Festival | March 15, 2026 | Kaohsiung | Taiwan | Dream Mall Front Plaza | |
