= Paul Rand =

American graphic designer (1914–1996)

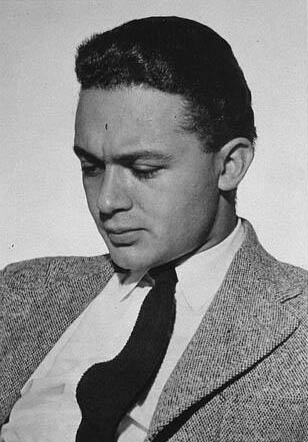
- Rand in 1942
- Born: Peretz Rosenbaum; August 15, 1914; Brooklyn, New York, U.S.
- Died: November 26, 1996 (aged 82); Norwalk, Connecticut, U.S.
- Education: Pratt Institute (1929–32); Parsons (1932–33); Art Students League of New York (1933–34)
- Occupations: Graphic designer Professor
- Spouses: Harriet Wallace (m. 1937; div. 1946); Anne Binkley (m. 1949, divorced); Marion Swannie
- Children: Catherine

Paul Rand (born Peretz Rosenbaum; August 15, 1914 – November 26, 1996) was an American art director and graphic designer. He is known for his corporate logo designs, including logos for IBM, UPS, Enron, Morningstar, Inc., Westinghouse, ABC, and NeXT. He developed an American Modernist style from European influences and was one of the first American commercial artists to embrace and practice the Swiss Style of graphic design. Rand was a professor emeritus of graphic design at Yale University in New Haven, Connecticut, where he taught from 1956 to 1969, and from 1974 to 1985. He was inducted into the New York Art Directors Club Hall of Fame in 1972.

== Early life and education ==
Paul Rand was born Peretz Rosenbaum on August 15, 1914, in Brooklyn, New York, the son of Lena (née Hecht) and Isidore Rosenbaum. He had an identical twin brother, Philip (Fishel), and an older sister, Ruth. Rand embraced design at a very young age, painting signs for his father's grocery store as well as for school events at P.S. 109.

Because Rand's father did not believe art could provide his son with a sufficient livelihood, he required Paul to attend Manhattan's Haaren High School while taking night classes at the Pratt Institute. Rand was largely "self-taught" as a designer, learning about the works of Cassandre and László Moholy-Nagy from European magazines such as Gebrauchsgraphik." Rand also attended Parsons School of Design and the Art Students League of New York.

== Early career ==
His career began with humble assignments, starting with a part-time position creating stock images for a syndicate that supplied graphics to various newspapers and magazines. Between his class assignments and his work, Rand was able to amass a fairly large portfolio, largely influenced by the German advertising style Sachplakat (object poster) as well as the works of the Danish-American designer Gustav Jensen.

It was around this time that he decided to camouflage the overtly Jewish identity conveyed by his name, Peretz Rosenbaum, shortening his forename to "Paul" and taking "Rand" from an uncle to form a Madison Avenue–friendly surname. Morris Wyszogrod, a friend and associate of Rand, noted that "he figured that 'Paul Rand,' four letters here, four letters there, would create a nice symbol. So he became Paul Rand." Roy R. Behrens notes the importance of this new title: "Rand's new persona, which served as the brand name for his many accomplishments, was the first corporate identity he created, and it may also eventually prove to be the most enduring." Indeed, Rand was rapidly moving into the forefront of his profession.

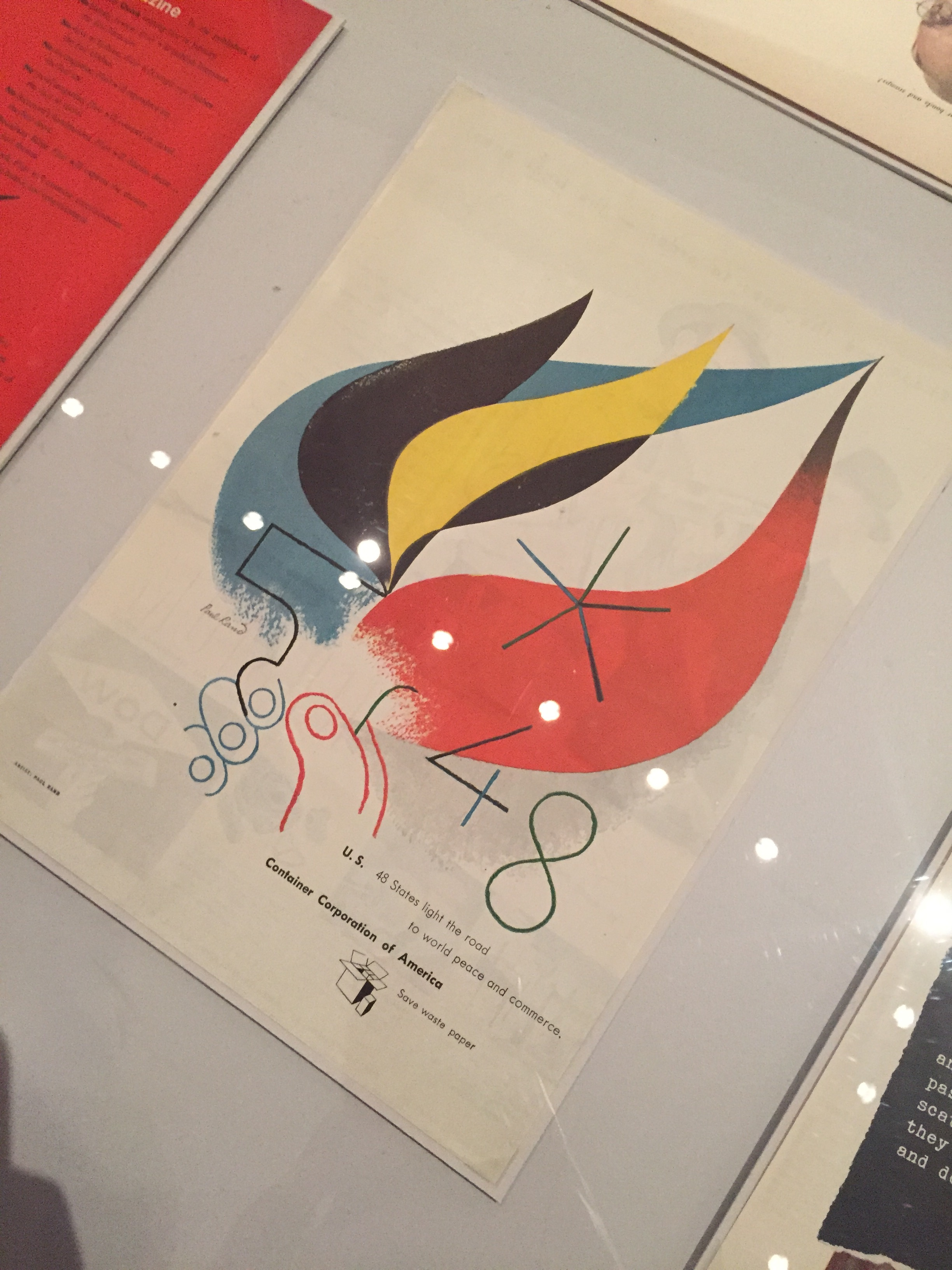
An early advertisement design by Paul Rand (featured in the Museum of the City of New York's Retrospective on his work in Spring 2015)

In his early twenties, he was producing work that began to garner international acclaim, notably his designs on the covers of Direction magazine, which Rand produced for no fee in exchange for full artistic freedom. Among the accolades Rand received were those of László Moholy-Nagy:

Among these young Americans, it seems to be that Paul Rand is one of the best and most capable ... He is a painter, lecturer, industrial designer, [and] advertising artist who draws his knowledge and creativeness from the resources of this country. He is an idealist and a realist, using the language of the poet and business man. He thinks in terms of need and function. He is able to analyze his problems but his fantasy is boundless.

Around 1934 Rand's reputation was exceptional. This only managed to increase through the years as his influential works and writings firmly established him as the éminence grise of his profession.

Although Rand was most famous for the corporate logos he created in the 1950s and 1960s, his early work in page design was the initial source of his reputation. In 1936, Rand was given the job of setting the page layout for an Apparel Arts (now GQ) magazine anniversary issue. "His remarkable talent for transforming mundane photographs into dynamic compositions, which ... gave editorial weight to the page" earned Rand a full-time job, as well as an offer to take over as art director for the Esquire-Coronet magazines. Initially, Rand refused this offer, claiming that he was not yet at the level the job required, but a year later he decided to go ahead with it, taking over responsibility for Esquire's fashion pages at the young age of twenty-three.

The cover art for Direction magazine proved to be an important step in the development of the "Paul Rand look" that was not as yet fully developed. The December 1940 cover, which uses barbed wire to present the magazine as both a war-torn gift and a crucifix, is indicative of the artistic freedom Rand enjoyed at Direction; in Thoughts on Design Rand notes that it "is significant that the crucifix, aside from its religious implications, is a demonstration of pure plastic form as well ... a perfect union of the aggressive vertical (male) and the passive horizontal (female)."

== Corporate identities ==
"Eye Bee M" poster designed by Rand in 1981 for IBM

Rand's most widely known contributions to design are his corporate identities, many of which are still in use. IBM, ABC, Cummins Engine, UPS, and Enron, among many others, owe Rand their graphical heritage. One of his strengths, as Moholy-Nagy pointed out, was his ability as a salesman to explain the needs his identities would address for the corporation. According to graphic designer Louis Danziger:

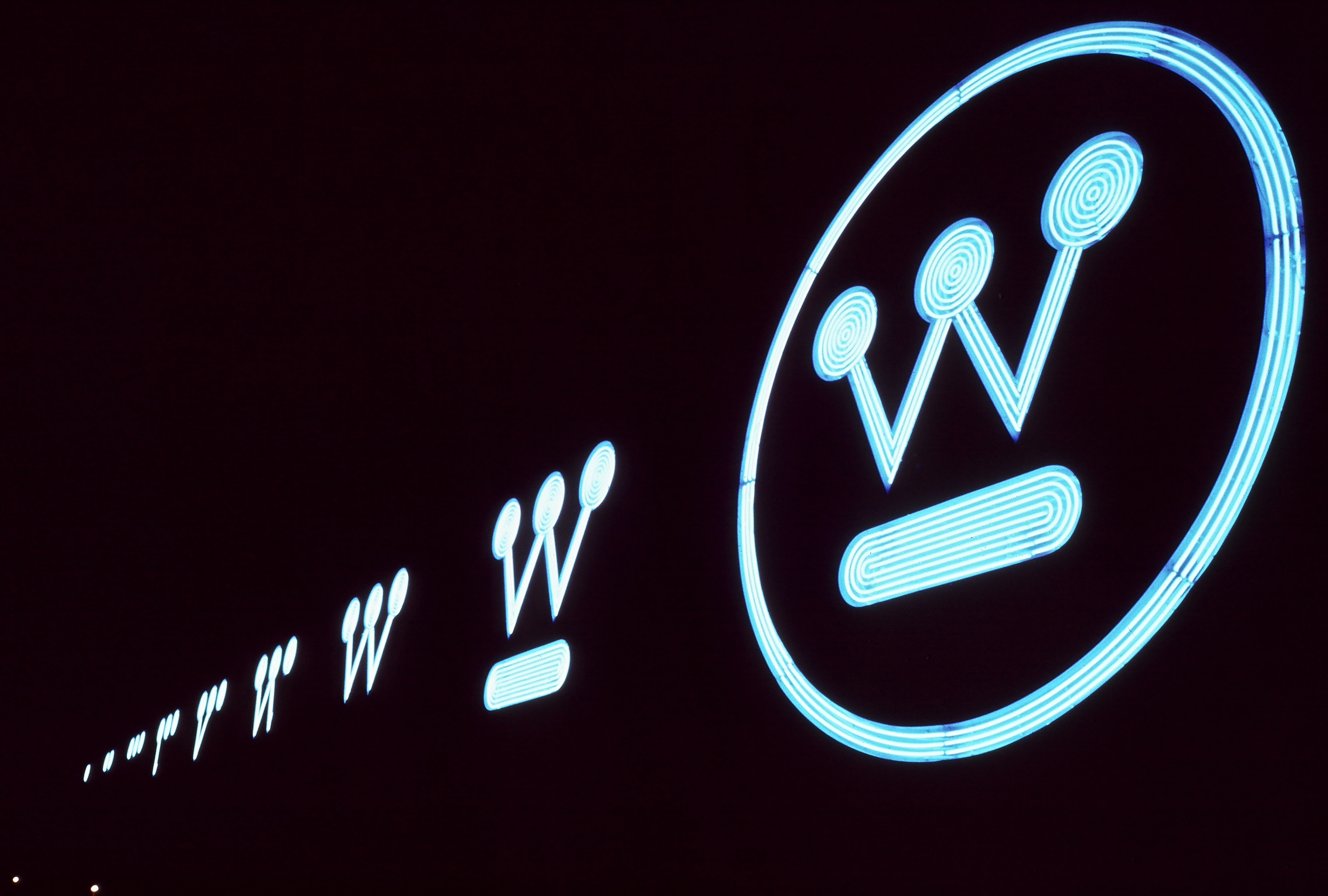
Rand's Westinghouse Sign and logo

He almost singlehandedly convinced business that design was an effective tool. [. . .] Anyone designing in the 1950s and 1960s owed much to Rand, who largely made it possible for us to work. He more than anyone else made the profession reputable. We went from being commercial artists to being graphic designers largely on his merits.

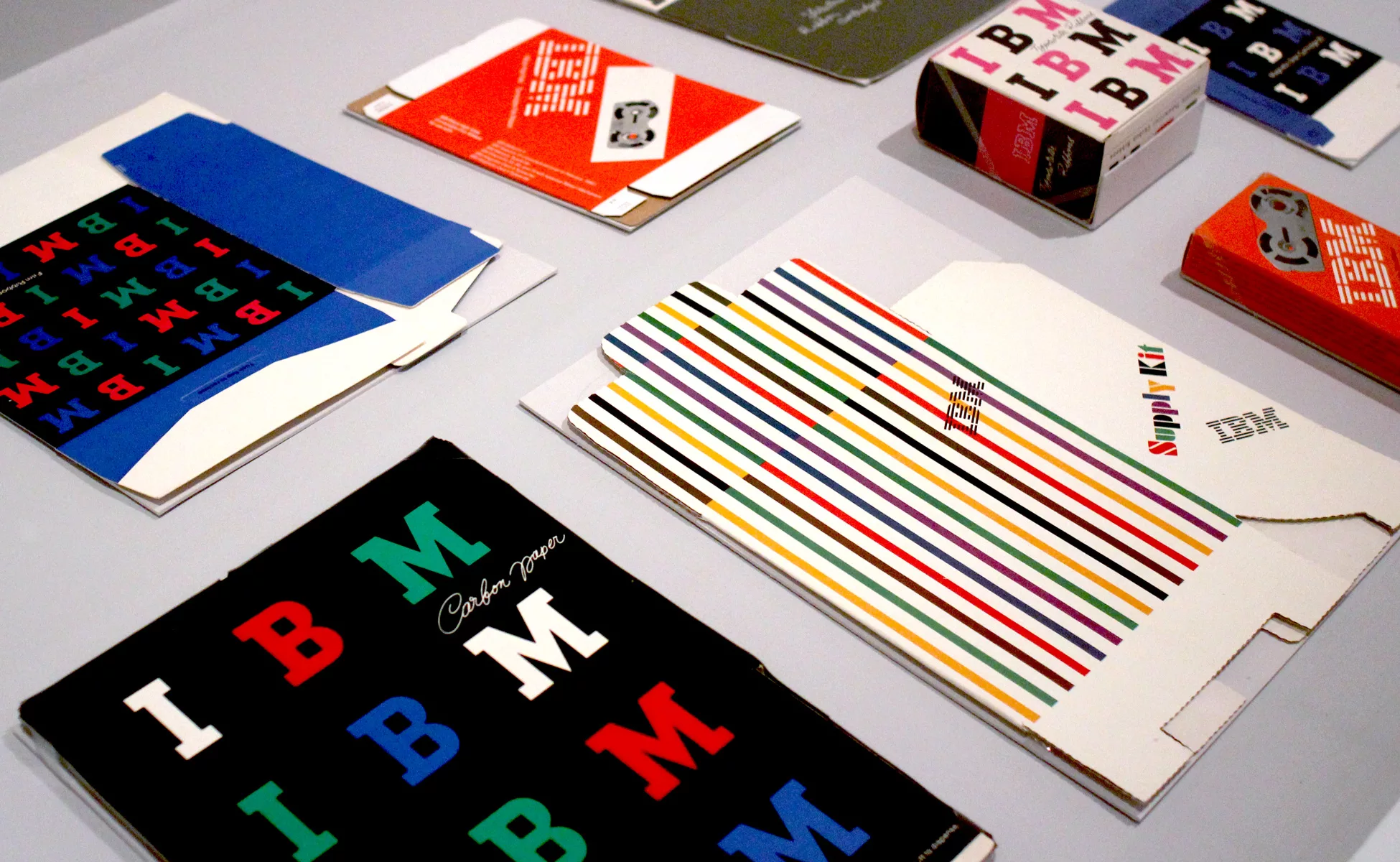
Graphic design applications created for IBM by Paul Rand

Rand's defining corporate identity was his IBM logo in 1956, which as Mark Favermann notes "was not just an identity but a basic design philosophy which permeated corporate consciousness and public awareness." The logo was modified by Rand in 1960. The striped logo was created in 1972. The stripes were introduced as a half-toning technique to make the IBM mark slightly less heavy and more dynamic. Two variations of the "striped" logo were designed; one with eight stripes, one with thirteen stripes. The bolder mark with eight stripes was intended as the company's default logo, while the more delicate thirteen-stripe version was used for situations where a more-refined look was required, such as IBM executive stationery and business cards. Rand also designed packaging, marketing materials and assorted communications for IBM from the late 1950s until the late 1990s, including the well-known Eye-Bee-M poster. Although Ford appointed Rand in the 1960s to redesign its corporate logo, it refused to use his modernized design.

Although the logos may be interpreted as simplistic, Rand was quick to point out in A Designer's Art that "ideas do not need to be esoteric to be original or exciting." His Westinghouse trademark, created in 1960, epitomizes that ideal of minimalism while attesting Rand's point that a logo "cannot survive unless it is designed with the utmost simplicity and restraint." Rand remained vital as he aged, continuing to produce important corporate identities into the 1980s and 1990s with a rumored $100,000 price per single design. The most notable of his later works was his collaboration with Steve Jobs for the NeXT Computer corporate identity; Rand's simple black box breaks the company name into two lines, producing a visual harmony that endeared the logogram to Jobs. Jobs was pleased; just prior to Rand's death in 1996, his former client labeled him "the greatest living graphic designer".

=== Logos designed by Rand ===
Westinghouse (1960)

United Parcel Service (1961)

American Broadcasting Company (1962)

Unused logo concept Ford Motor Company (1966)

International Business Machines (1972)

Yale University Press (1985)

Enron

NeXT (1986)

== Later years ==
Rand devoted his final years to design work and the writing of his memoirs. In 1996, he died of cancer at age 82 in Norwalk, Connecticut.

Prior to his death, Rand asked his friend and fellow graphic designer Fred Troller to design his headstone. Graphic design author Steven Heller, known for his insightful commentary on design principles, offered praise for Rand's memorial. Heller stated “The memorial stands out among rows of traditional tombstones in the Connecticut cemetery for its economical beauty, subtle ingenuity, and elegant typography."

== Influences and other works ==
=== Development of theory ===
Though Rand was a recluse in his creative process, doing the vast majority of the design load despite having a large staff at varying points in his career, he was very interested in producing books of theory to illuminate his philosophies. László Moholy-Nagy may have incited Rand's zeal for knowledge when he asked his colleague, at their first meeting, if he read art criticism. Rand said no, prompting Moholy-Nagy to reply "Pity." Steven Heller elaborates on this meeting's impact, noting; "from that moment on, Rand devoured books by the leading philosophers on art, including Roger Fry, Alfred North Whitehead, and John Dewey." These theoreticians would have a lasting impression on Rand's work; in a 1995 interview with Michael Kroeger discussing, among other topics, the importance of Dewey's Art as Experience, Rand elaborates on Dewey's appeal:

[... Art as Experience] deals with everything — there is no subject he does not deal with. That is why it will take you one hundred years to read this book. Even today's philosophers talk about it[.] [E]very time you open this book you find good things. I mean the philosophers say this, not just me. You read this, then when you open this up next year, that you read something new.

Dewey is an important source for Rand's underlying sentiment in graphic design; on page one of Rand's groundbreaking Thoughts on Design, the author begins drawing lines from Dewey's philosophy to the need for "functional-aesthetic perfection" in modern art. Among the ideas Rand pushed in Thoughts on Design was the practice of creating graphic works capable of retaining recognizable quality even after being blurred or mutilated, a test Rand routinely performed on his corporate identities.

==== Criticism ====
During Rand's later career, he became increasingly agitated about the rise of postmodernist theory and aesthetic in design. In 1992, Rand resigned his position at Yale in protest of the appointment of postmodern designer Sheila Levrant de Bretteville, and convinced his colleague Armin Hofmann to do the same. In justification of his resignation, Rand penned the article "Confusion and Chaos: The Seduction of Contemporary Graphic Design", in which he denounced the postmodern movement as "faddish and frivolous" and "harbor[ing] its own built-in boredom".

Despite the importance graphic designers place on his book Thoughts on Design, subsequent works such as From Lascaux to Brooklyn (1996), compounded accusations of Rand being "reactionary and hostile to new ideas about design". Steven Heller defends Rand's later ideas, calling the designer "an enemy of mediocrity, a radical modernist" while Favermann considers the period one of "a reactionary, angry old man". Regardless of this dispute, Rand's contribution to modern graphic design theory in total is widely considered intrinsic to the profession's development.

=== Modernist influences ===
The core ideology that drove Rand's career, and hence his lasting influence, was the modernist philosophy he so revered. He celebrated the works of artists from Paul Cézanne to Jan Tschichold, and constantly attempted to draw the connections between their creative output and significant applications in graphic design. In A Designer's Art Rand clearly demonstrates his appreciation for the underlying connections:

From Impressionism to Pop Art, the commonplace and even the comic strip have become ingredients for the artist's cauldron. What Cézanne did with apples, Picasso with guitars, Léger with machines, Schwitters with rubbish, and Duchamp with urinals makes it clear that revelation does not depend upon grandiose concepts. The problem of the artist is to defamiliarize the ordinary.

== Bibliography ==
- Rand, Paul (1985). Paul Rand: A Designer's Art. New Haven: Yale University Press. ISBN 978-0300082821.
- Rand, Paul (1994). Design, Form, and Chaos. New Haven: Yale University Press. ISBN 978-0300055535.
- Rand, Paul (1996). From Lascaux to Brooklyn. New Haven: Yale University Press. ISBN 978-0300066760.
- Rand, Paul (2016). Paul Rand: A Designer's Art. New York: Princeton Architectural Press. ISBN 978-1616894863.
