= Westinghouse Sign =

Sign in Pittsburgh, Pennsylvania, US

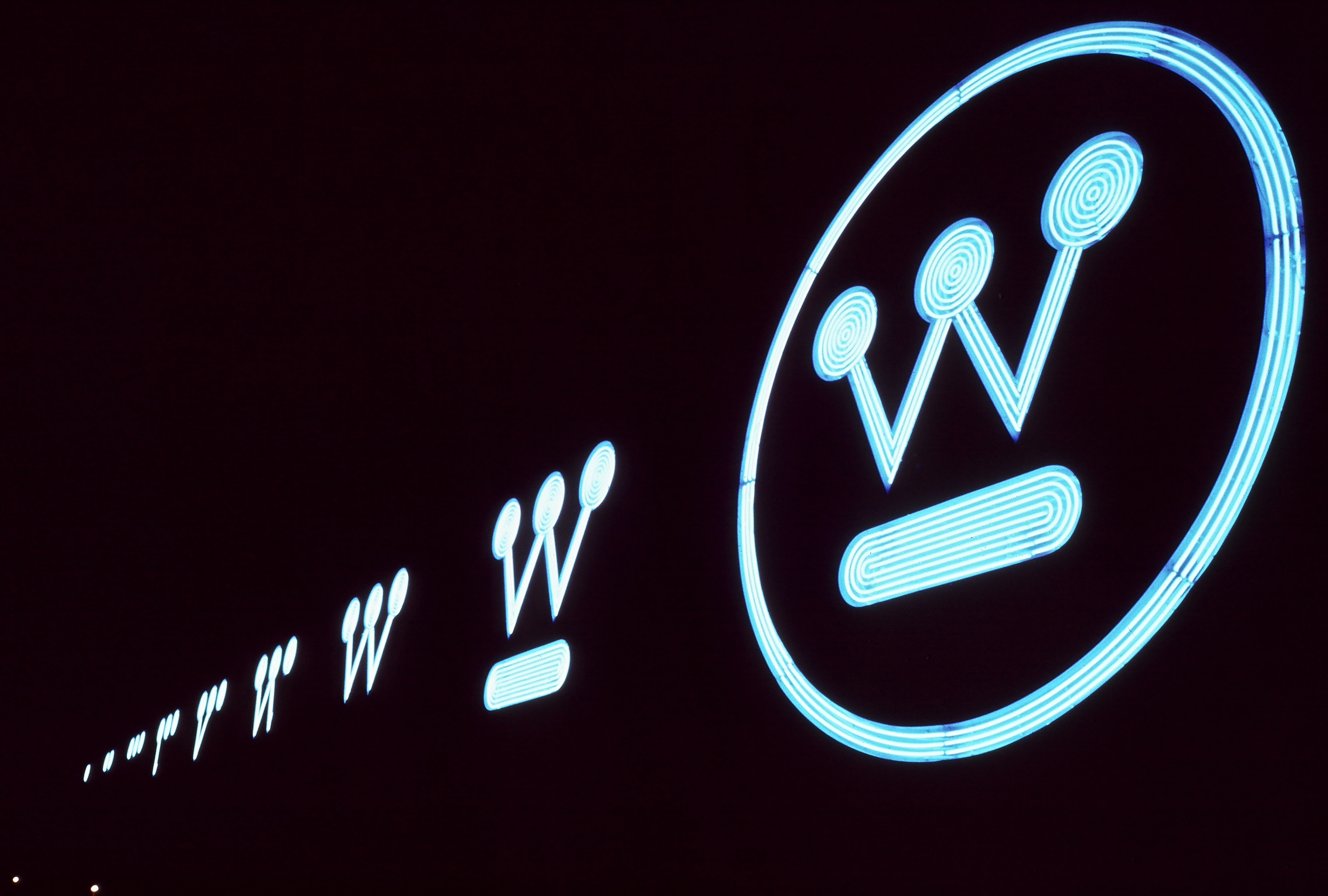

General information
- Status: Demolished
- Type: Sign
- Location: 209 West General Robinson; Pittsburgh, Pennsylvania; United States
- Coordinates: 40.447392°N 80.006457°W
- Completed: 1967
- Demolished: 1998

The Westinghouse Sign was the first computer-controlled sign in the United States. Located in Pittsburgh, Pennsylvania, the large animated display advertised the Westinghouse Electric Company, and was best known for the seemingly endless number of combinations in which its individual elements could be illuminated. The sign was removed in 1998 when the building on which it was mounted was demolished to make way for the construction of PNC Park.

== History ==
On December 9, 1948, the Westinghouse Electric Supply Company (Wesco) moved into a new building located at 209 West General Robinson Street in the North Shore section of Pittsburgh. Wesco was a wholesale distributor of electrical apparatus, and a subsidiary of the Westinghouse Electric Company founded by George Westinghouse in 1886.

For many years, a large orange and blue sign on the Wesco roof proclaimed the company's advertising slogan: "You can be sure…if it’s Westinghouse." The sign was pointed to the south, across the Allegheny River, making it easy to see from Downtown Pittsburgh.

Early in 1966, Westinghouse decided to replace the aging advertising sign on the Wesco Building. The idea was to remove the slogan from the existing 200-foot (61 m) support structure, and replace it with a modern view of the Westinghouse corporate identity.

In due course, Richard Huppertz, manager of design coordination at Westinghouse, developed a concept that would bring greater recognition to the 'circle w' logo created by graphic designer Paul Rand. Rather than using words, the sign Huppertz had in mind would rely solely on the Westinghouse corporate mark. The concept was then presented to Paul Rand, who produced a design emphasizing the nine elements of the logo he had illustrated in a 1960 graphics standards guide.

== Construction and operation ==
A 16mm film of the Westinghouse Sign in Pittsburgh, Pennsylvania, 1967

An 8mm film of the Westinghouse Sign in Pittsburgh, Pennsylvania, 1976

The Pittsburgh Outdoor Advertising Corporation installed the Westinghouse sign in June 1967 using 3,000 feet (910 m) of neon tubing filled with argon gas, giving the display its characteristic blue color. The sign was composed of nine repetitions of the familiar 'circle w' logo, each of which was 17.5 feet (5.3 m) in diameter and initially divided into nine sections—the enclosing circle, the four diagonal strokes of the W, the three dots above the W, and the bar below—meaning that the entire sign comprised eighty-one individual elements. In later years, an extra element was added to each logo by allowing the top and bottom of the enclosing circle to be independently illuminated. The ninety element configuration increased the number of possible display combinations, but sacrificed the elegance of the original design.

The Wesco Building stood near Three Rivers Stadium, and its sign was one of several large illuminated corporate billboards that became a fixture of Pittsburgh's evening skyline. Among the others were the Alcoa sign atop Mount Washington, and the Clark Bar sign on the D. L. Clark Company Building.

The sign was demolished when the Wesco Building was razed in the autumn of 1998 to make way for PNC Park, which succeeded Three Rivers as the home of the Pittsburgh Pirates. Preservationists attempted to save at least one of the 'circle w' units for eventual display at the Heinz History Center. Both the physical structure and electrical components were in such a state of decay that nothing was salvageable.

== Other signs ==
A second sign was located in Emeryville, California, facing the San Francisco Bay.

Smaller versions of the sign, using three repetitions of the 'circle w' insignia, were erected atop the Westinghouse Outdoor Lighting Plant in Cleveland, Ohio, and on the north side of the Long Island Expressway in Queens, New York.

== Photo gallery ==
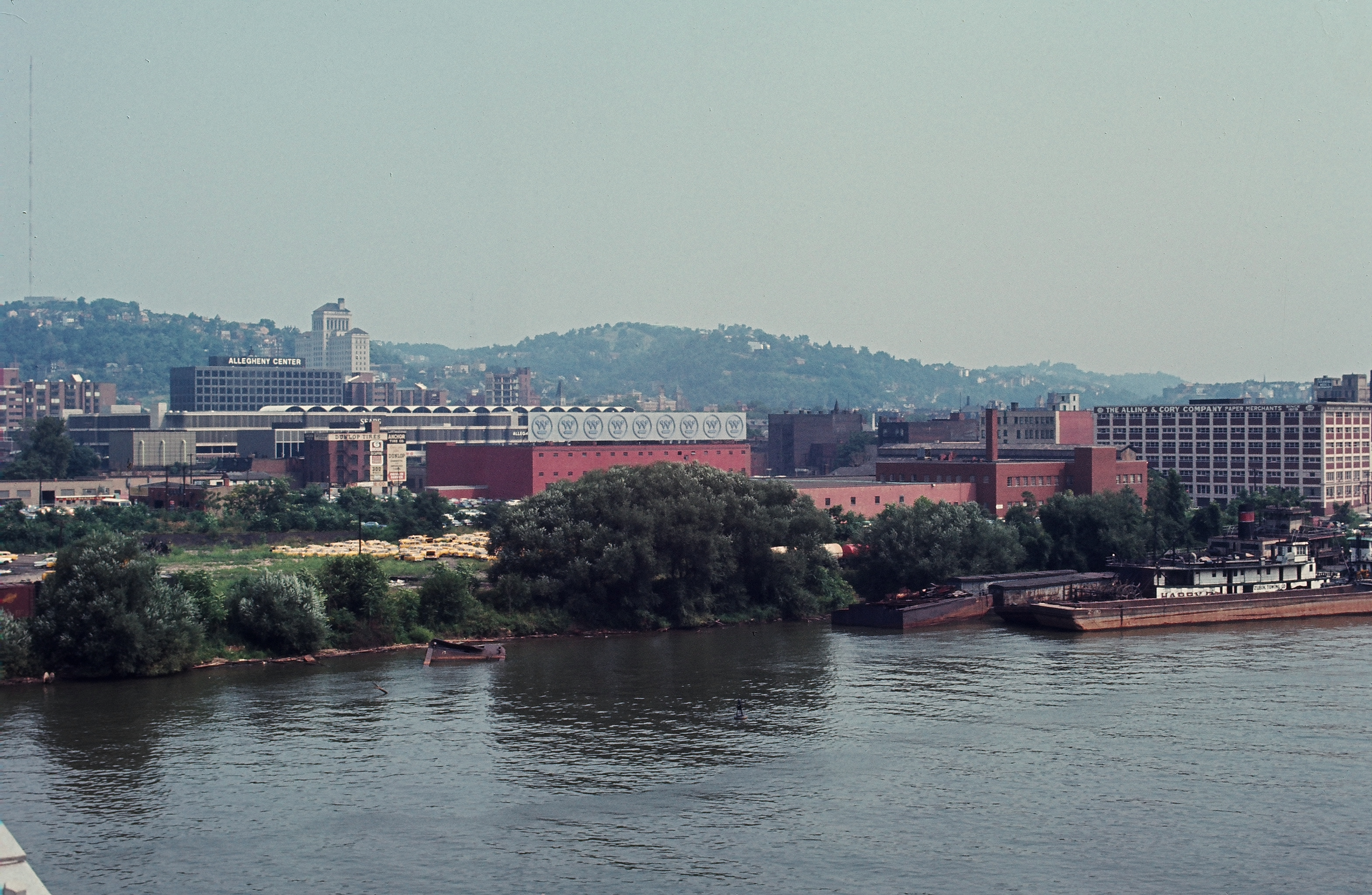
Wesco Building in Pittsburgh, 1967

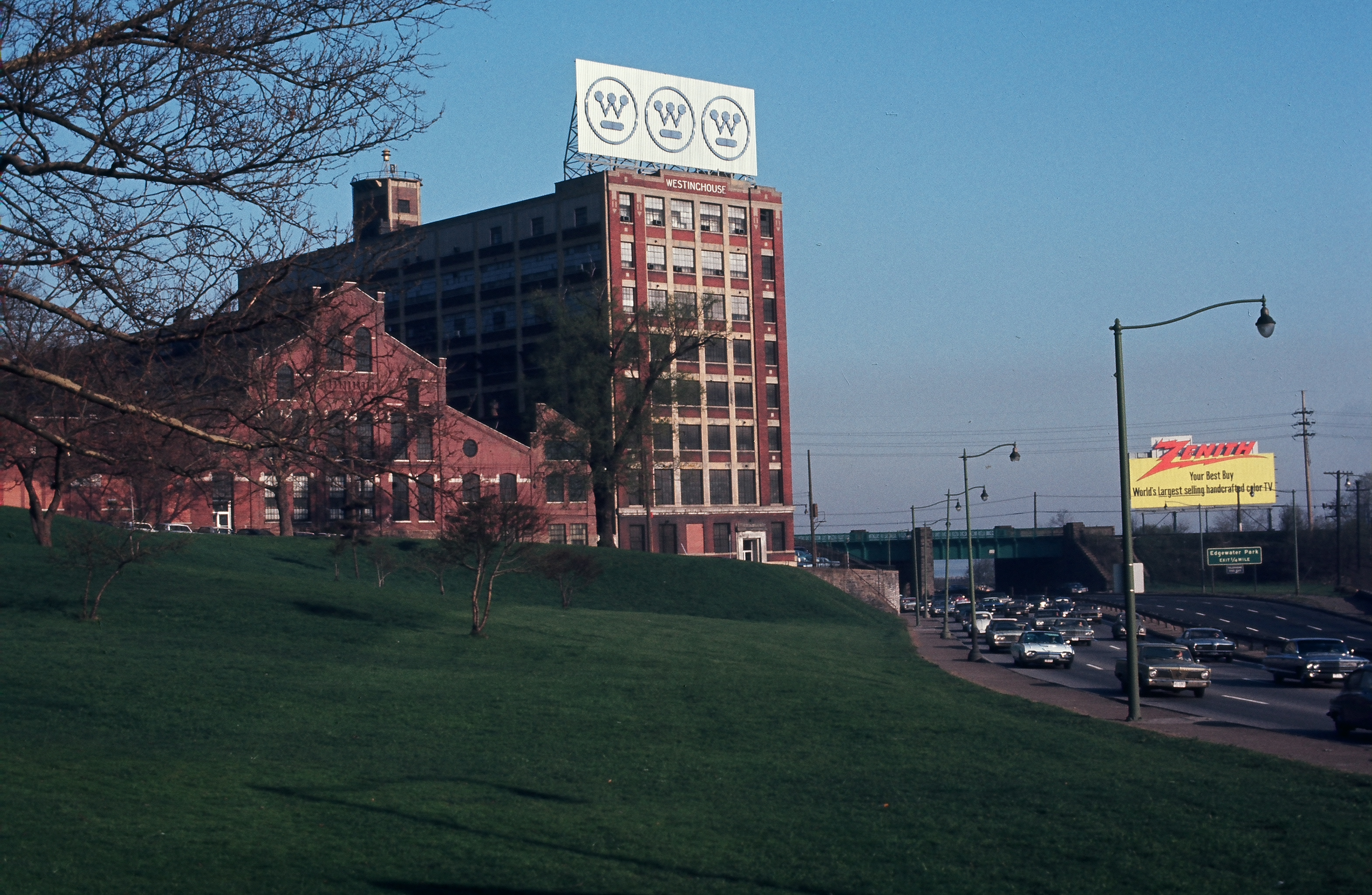
Westinghouse sign in Cleveland, 1969

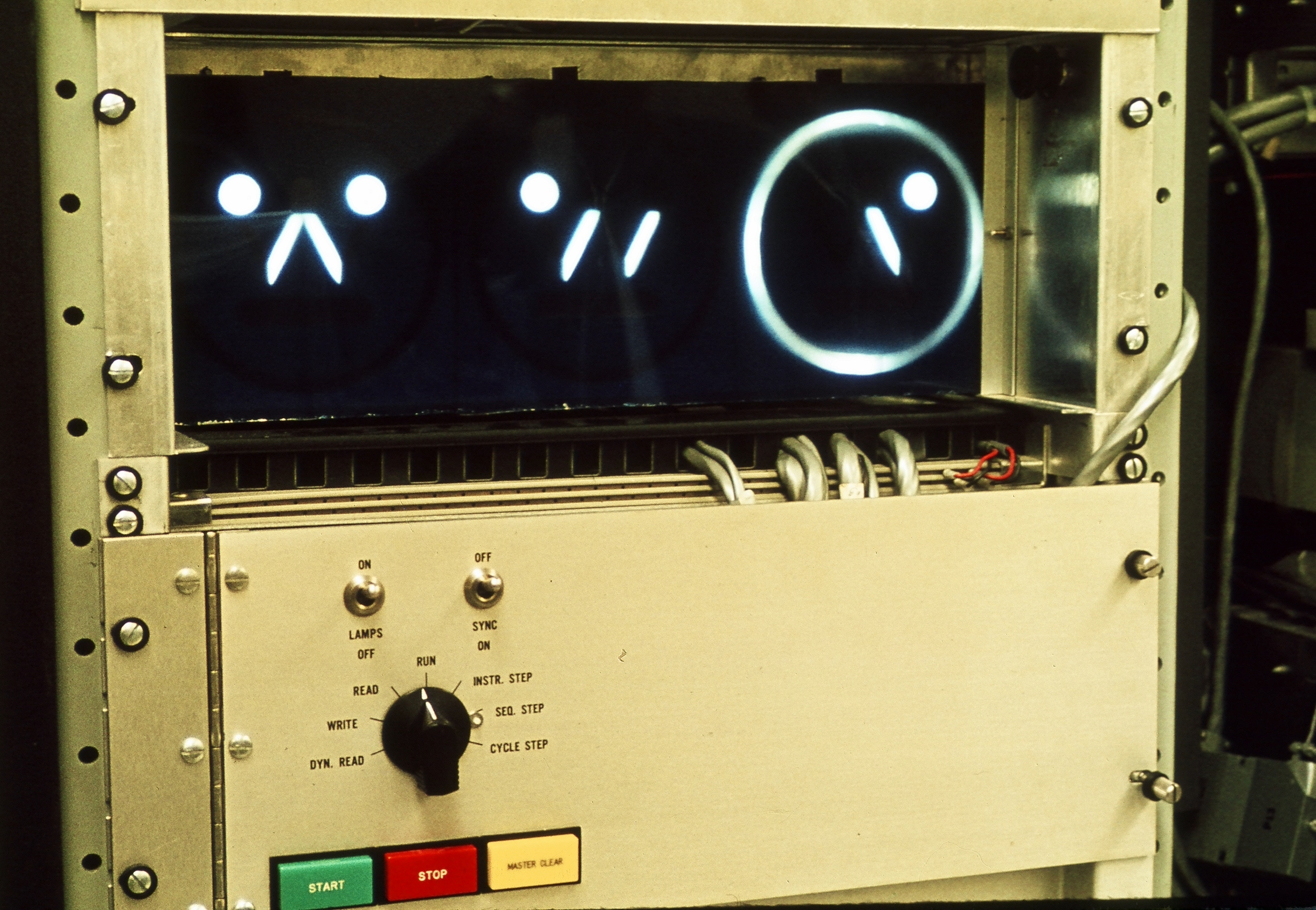
Sign controller in Cleveland, 1969

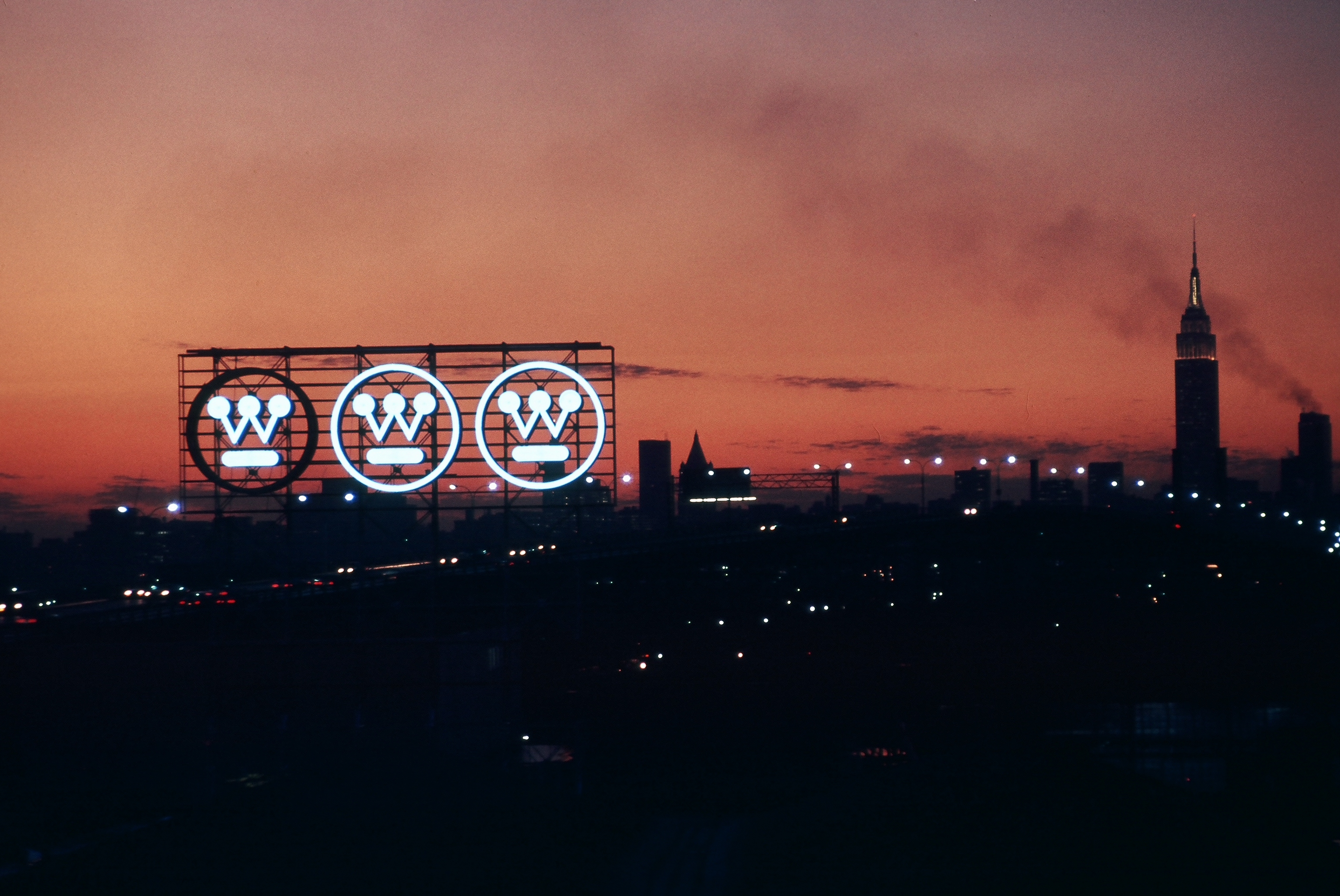
Westinghouse sign in New York, 1972

== Combinations ==
It was commonly believed that there were practically an infinite number of sequences in which the sign's elements could be lit, and that no sequence was ever repeated. The Westinghouse Electric Corporation encouraged this perception. In reality, they were lit in a pattern that repeated every six minutes, and the pattern was changed from time to time; the sign had 120 usable combinations of lit and unlit elements, and each six-minute pattern was a selected subset of those 120. A Westinghouse Prodac 50 computer controlled the sign, since it was well-suited to handling repetitive tasks.

An animation representing one possible lighting sequence of the Westinghouse Sign

== See also ==
- Neon sign
