= Dance Alloy =

Pittsburgh Dance Alloy was a modern dance repertory company based in the Pittsburgh, Pennsylvania's neighborhood of Friendship. It suspended operations in 2012 following a merger with the Kelly-Strayhorn Theater.

== History and mission ==
The Pittsburgh Dance Alloy was founded in 1976 at the University of Pittsburgh as an artistic collective of nine dancers. Margaret Skrinar, Director of Dance, was the founder with the help of Yolanda Marino and Mary Goodman of the Pittsburgh Dance Council and guest artists Murray Louis, Kathryn Posin and Dan Wagoner. The first concert was performed in December 1976 at the Stephen Foster Memorial Theater and was directed by company choreographer, Rebecca Rice. The Dance Alloy moved off-campus in 1980, and two years later Susan Gillis and Elsa Limbach were named co-artistic directors. Limbach became sole artistic director in 1984 and moved the company to studio space in the Carnegie Museum of Pittsburgh.

Established New York choreographer Mark Taylor became artistic director in 1991 and the company continued to grow, touring extensively both nationally and internationally, and offering dance classes in the community. In 1995 it expanded again, under the executive director Stephanie Flom, building its own state-of-the-art studios and employing six full-time dancers as well as numerous technical staff and arts administrators.

Dance Alloy's repertory included works by Claudia Gitelman, Lynn Dally, Kathryn Posin, Carolyn Brown, Elsa Limbach, Susan Gillis, Mark Dendy, Eiko & Koma, Bill T. Jones, José Limón, Victoria Marks, Charles Moulton, Mark Taylor, Douglas Nielson, Tere O'Connor, Pilobolus, Bill Evans, Rebecca Rice Flanagan, J Michael Kane, Gail Stepanek, Jerry Pearson and Elizabeth Streb. In 2003, Beth Corning was chosen to be the next artistic director. Corning was the force behind the reconstruction of the company, and "changed its name to better reflect the diversity of this genre." The last Artistic Director was Greer Reed-Jones.

Dance Alloy's mission was something called "Breaking the Fourth Wall." The back wall, when the audience looks at the stage, is referred to as the upstage. The next two walls are the wings or the sides of the stage, and the fourth wall is the barrier between the audience and the stage. This is the wall that Dance Alloy tried to break, the point being to completely engage the audience in the performance. They also set goals to immerse themselves in the community surrounding Dance Alloy, and they achieved this by offering dance education to adults and children of all ages.

On June 27, 2012, a merger was announced between the Kelly-Strayhorn Theater in East Liberty and Dance Alloy. Kelly-Strayhorn would manage daily operations of Dance Alloy and the Dance Alloy School but the dance company itself would not be active.

The final Company was under the artistic direction of Greer Reed Jones when it dissolved in 2012. Jones joined the Dance Alloy staff in June 2009. Along with the artistic director the company also employed five contracted dancers, including Maribeth Maxa, Stephanie Dumaine, Christopher Bandy, Michael Walsh and Adrienne Misko.

== Staff of ALLOY School today ==
Name	Dance Background
Greer Reed-Jones (Education Director/ Artistic Director)	Greer began training with the Pittsburgh Black Dance Ensemble then continued on to the University of the Arts in Philadelphia and the Dance Theater of Harlem in New York. She then became a member of the Alvin Ailey Repertory Ensemble after completing the programs of the Alvin Ailey American Dance Theater. She then moved on to become a dancer with Dayton Contemporary Dance Company in Dayton, Ohio.
Michael Walsh (Teacher/ Contracted Dancer)	Michael has danced with Shawn Womack Dance Projects in Cincinnati, Ohio. Michael began teaching at the Dance Alloy in 1999.
Christopher Bandy (Teacher/ Contracted Dancer)	Christopher began his career with American Repertory Ballet in 1997. He has experience with the Pittsburgh Ballet Theatre and Terpsicorps Theater of Dance in Asheville, North Carolina.
Kadiatou Conte-Forte (Teacher)	As a teenager, Kadiatou was accepted into Les Ballets Africans, the national dance company of Guinea. She later moved to the United States and began her own group, Balafon West African Dance Company. She then moved to Pittsburgh and became the Artistic Director of UMOJA African Arts Company.
Teena Custer (Teacher)	Teena earned a BA in Dance from Slippery Rock University and an MFA degree from Ohio State University. She has danced with Dance Alloy, Attack Theater, and Ursula Payne.
Veronica Sansing (Teacher)	Veronica is currently a member of Sahara Dance Troupe, a belly dance company in Pittsburgh. Her Middle Eastern skills include Tunisian folkloric, American tribal, Greek and Turkish rom, Lebanese cabaret, Egyptian Cabaret, classical and Raqs Sharqi. She also has background in modern dance, hip hop, swing, ballet, African dance, and Latin dance.
Mary Ann Blair (Teacher)	Mary performs with the Sahara Dance Company. She has also performed with Raqia Hassan, Mona El Said, Mahmoud Reda, Dr. Mo Geddawi and Yousry Sharif.
Aboubacar Camara (Teacher)	Oscar has been a dancer and choreographer for Les Ballets Africains in the Republic of Guinea, the Ballet d'Afrique Noir in the Republic of Senegal, and Koteba D'Abidjan in the Ivory Coast. He has performed in many important venues including at the Apollo Theater in New York and the Bolshoi Theatre in Moscow.
Allie Greene (Teacher)	Allie created CLIMB (Creative Learning in Moving Bodies), a program used for children with special needs. She is the owner of Pittsburgh Pilates Studio at Wexford Dance Academy.
Shira Krasnow (Teacher)	Shira teaches Hip Hop at universities around Pittsburgh. She choreographs musicals at Taylor Allderdice. She has danced for Flo Rida, Nas, Clipse, Lupe Fiasco, Young Jeezy and Vanilla Ice.
Gretchen Moore (Teacher)	Gretchen is a member of Laboratory Company Dance (LABCO). She teaches dance classes at Chatham College and West Virginia Wesleyan College.
Ayisha A. Morgan-Lee (Teacher)	Ayisha Founded Hill Dance Academy Theater and is the Artistic Director of the dance company Ju-B-Lation: Spirit Filled Feet. She received The African American Council of the Arts Onyx Award for Best Choreography in a Musical for Black Nativity in 2007.
Jennifer Quinio (Teacher)	Jennifer has taught Zumba many places around Pittsburgh including Modern Formations Gallery and Performance Space and Club. She is a board member of the Bloomfield-Garfield Corporation.
Trinidad "Trini" Regaspi (Teacher)	Trini and her husband founded PATangoS (Pittsburgh Argentine Tango Society) in 2002.
Mercedes Searer (Teacher)	Mercedes began her career with Windhover Dance Company. She has performed with Attack Theater and Tracie Yorke Dance. She choreographs and dances with Knot Dance in Pittsburgh and has taught outreach programs for Attack Theater, Dance Alloy, and Civic Light Opera.
Marlon Silvia (Teacher)	Marlon choreographs, teaches and performs Salsa and Merengue. He is the host of the Let's Dance Salsa video series.
Laurie Tarter (Teacher)	Laurie has a background in tai chi, contemporary dance, aerobics, and yoga. She is one of the original members of the Dance Alloy, as a performer, choreographer, and teacher. Laurie came up with the name "Dance Alloy" in 1976. The name was overwhelmingly agreed upon by the original members of the company.
Maribeth Maxa (Contracted Dancer)	Maribeth graduated with a Bachelor of Fine Arts from the Juilliard School. She has performed with the Metropolitan Repertory Ballet, Gleich Dances Contemporary Ballet, and Fly-By-Night, a trapeze dance company.
Stephanie Dumaine (Contracted Dancer)	Stephanie attended North Carolina School of the Arts. She has been a member of the Casco Bay Movers Jazz Company in Portland, Maine, and Corning and Dances Company.
Adrienne Misko (Contracted Dancer)	Adrienne graduated with a Bachelor of Fine Arts in Dance Performance and Choreography from Ohio University in Athens, Ohio.

== See also ==
- List of dance companies
- Theatre in Pittsburgh
