= Crawford Grill =

- Crawford Grill No. 2
- U.S. National Register of Historic Places
- Pennsylvania Historical Marker
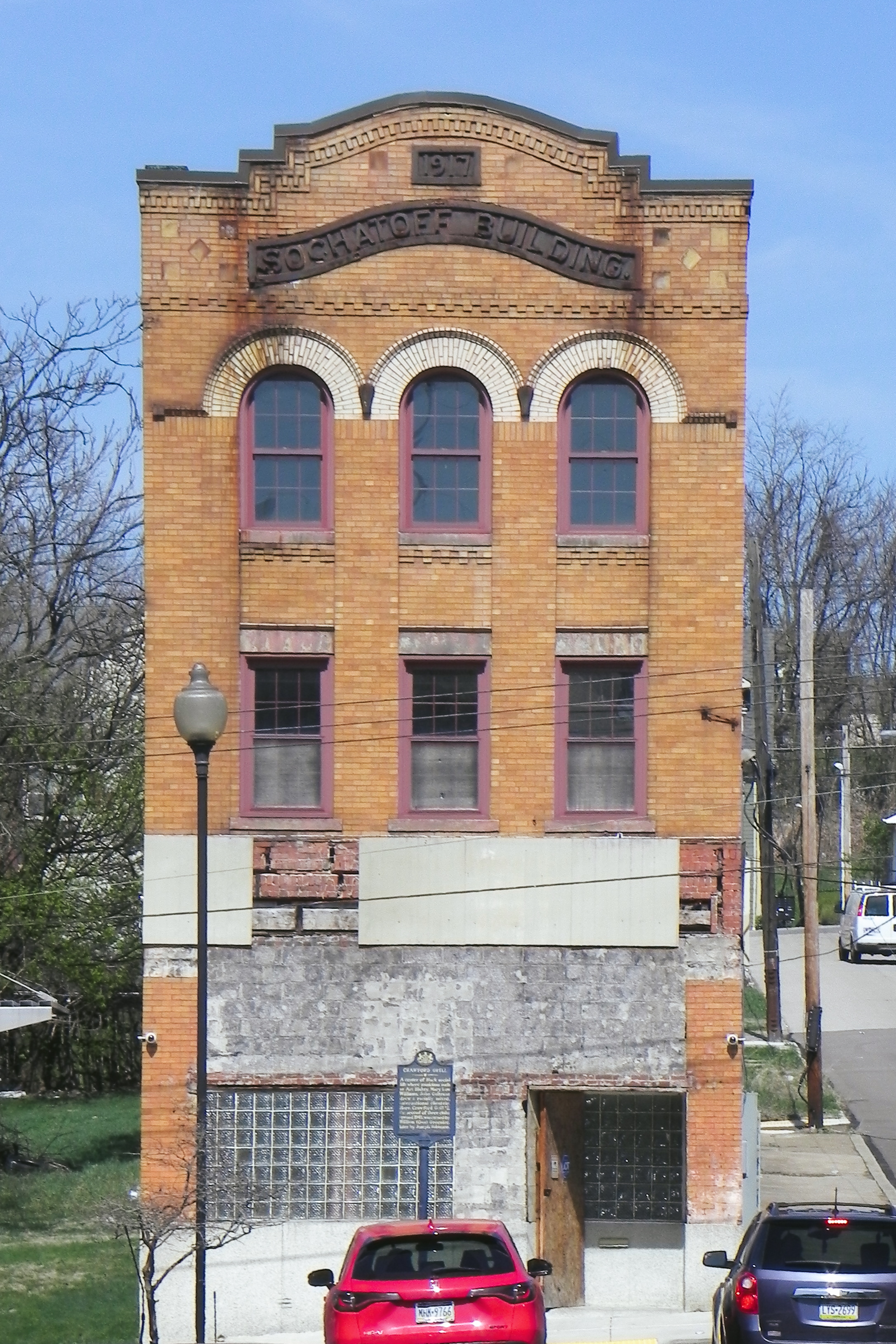
- Crawford Grill No. 2 (2025)

- Location within Pittsburgh
- Location: 2141 Wylie Avenue; Pittsburgh, Pennsylvania; U.S.
- Coordinates: 40.44567°N 79.97804°W
- NRHP reference No.: 100005373

Significant dates
- Added to NRHP: July 23, 2020
- Designated PHM: April 7, 2001

The Crawford Grill was a renowned jazz club that operated in two locations in the Hill District of Pittsburgh, Pennsylvania. During its heyday in the 1950s and 60s, the second Crawford Grill venue hosted local and nationally recognized acts, including jazz legends Art Blakey, Charles Mingus, Max Roach, Miles Davis, John Coltrane, Bill Evans, and Kenny Burrell. The club, an important social gathering spot for Pittsburgh's African-American communities, drew devoted listeners from the region's ethnically and racially diverse population making it a rare site of interracial socializing during the civil rights period. The Crawford Grill was one of many black-owned neighborhood clubs in the Eastern United States that supported a tour circuit for small jazz ensembles during the genre's "golden age". Despite the riots of 1968, which severely damaged the neighborhood's economic infrastructure, the club continued to operate until 2003, when it was shuttered. In 2010, a group of local investors purchased the property with the goal of restoring and reopening the location as a venue and restaurant.

== History ==
=== Origins of the Crawford Grill ===
The Crawford Grill can be best understood as the outgrowth of a broader set of social institutions that flourished in the Hill District neighborhood in the early 1900s. Known as "black-and-tan clubs", these venues featured black artists and catered to mixed-race patrons. The Leader House (1401 Wylie Avenue) and the Collins Inn (1213 Wylie Avenue) were two "black-and-tan clubs" that operated in the 1910s that were important because they offered a means through which entrepreneur William "Gus" Greenlee would enter the entertainment industry in the Hill District and would later become the Crawford Grill and Black Musicians' Union Club. The high standard of entertainment was established by pianist Earl Hines, who began his career as a jazz musician in the Hill District when he was hired by bandleader Lois Deppe to perform at the Leader House, and violinist Vernie Robinson at the Collins Inn. In 1922, the Collins Inn became the Paramount Inn under the ownership of Greenlee, who would become one of the Hill's most prominent African-American businessmen and owner of the Negro league baseball team the Pittsburgh Crawfords. But the club had already had several owners by the time Greenlee acquired it in 1933. It was purchased by Scott Bailey in 1932 and soon after was managed by James Brown, a local chef. Brown remained when Greenlee acquired the business. Nevertheless, Greenlee may be soundly credited for making the club famous. Greenlee's remodeled held its grand opening on Christmas Eve of 1933. A formal opening took place the following January. It was the first in the neighborhood to receive a liquor license (prohibition had been repealed for less than a month). An enthusiastic announcement in the Pittsburgh Courier promised patrons a bar designed after a Spanish hacienda, with "cool drinks and good food served in ultra, ultra style". The Crawford Grill had several incarnations at different addresses during its lifetime.

=== Crawford Grill No. 1 (1933–1951) ===
The original club was located at 1401 Wylie Avenue at Townsend Street in a hotel called the Leader House, which had been established in the 1910s. The third floor of the three-story structure was reserved for VIPs. Known colloquially as "Club Crawford," it served as Greenlee's reception room and office. The audience was racially and socially mixed. Locals from the Hill District were patrons, as were Pittsburgh's powerful families, athletes, and celebrities from out of town. According to Ralph Proctor, a professor of African American History, "The Grill provided a place of elegance in an area outsiders tended to think of as down-trodden." Nelson Harrison, a trombonist who played at the Crawford Grill, said, "The Grill was a melting pot. It had a peaceful, loving atmosphere. There was never any trouble." It remained in business until 1951 when it was destroyed by a fire. The building was demolished in 1959 as part of the Civic Arena development plan.

The second floor featured the C&G Club with a revolving stage, upright piano clad in mirrors, and a glass-topped bar. In addition to a program of out-of-town entertainers, Greenlee promised two special programs: "Chill Night" featuring Greenlee himself in the kitchen, and "Jewish Night", when his wife, Helen, did the same. The second-floor club opened in March 1935 with entertainment produced by Billy Maxey, featuring New York and Ohio performers. Local press declared it the Hill's "most popular 'hot spot'".

=== Crawford Grill No. 2 (1943–2003) ===
With his business partner Joseph Robinson, Greenlee opened a second venue on the corner of Wylie Avenue and Elmore Street, approximately ten blocks east of the original location. Robinson's son, William "Buzzy" Robinson, ran the club for almost 60 years, selling the business but retaining ownership of the building in 1992. In 2001, the Pennsylvania Historical and Museum Commission dedicated a marker on the site. Facing electrical and sewage problems, the last surviving Crawford Grill location (No. 2) closed its doors in 2003 and was put up for sale in 2006.

=== Crawford Grill No. 3 (1948–1955) ===
Located on the corner of Bidwell Street and Pennsylvania Avenue in the Manchester neighborhood of Pittsburgh, this club closed in just seven years.

=== New Crawford Grill at Station Square (2003–2006) ===
Capitalizing on the famous Crawford Grill name, Les Montgomery and Tom Burley opened a new venue at 125 West Station Square Drive in the Freight House Shops, in Pittsburgh's South Side neighborhood. The interior, designed by local architect Margaret Ringel, included seating for 180 guests, a bar, and a balcony. Hewing closely to the original Grill, the menu featured soul food. The venture was financed partly by the Urban Redevelopment Authority and promised 20–30 new jobs. Initially the new club was successful; upon the first anniversary of its opening, a newspaper described it as a "regular destination for jazz lovers". One local patron praised the new Grill, finding the music as good as it was in the original club during its heyday. Despite being awarded "best soul food" by a local paper three years running, the new club suffered from lack of foot traffic, closing its doors on January 7, 2006.

=== Legacy and the Crawford Grill Revitalization Project ===
After the closure of the Crawford Grill No. 2, building owner Buzzy Robinson sought buyers who would respect the legacy of the site. In 2010, local sources announced that an investment group including Pittsburgh Central Keystone Innovation Zone, Pittsburgh Gateways Corporation, Hill House EDC, and several private individuals had purchased the building for $275,000. Calling their initiative the "Crawford Grill Revitalization Project," the group has stated it aims to preserve the legacy of the building through restoration efforts and the establishment of a new restaurant and nightclub.

== Historical marker ==
The Pennsylvania Historical and Museum commission unveiled a blue and gold historical marker outside the Crawford Grill building on April 7, 2001. The unveiling marked the conclusion of a three-day conference focused on black history in Pennsylvania. In attendance were Pittsburgh councilman Sala Udin, the building's owner, William "Buzzie" Robinson, and the owner of the Crawford Grill business, Keith Ferris.

== In popular culture ==
The Crawford Grill is referenced in August Wilson's play Fences and his one-person production "How I Learned What I Learned". It is also referenced in Kevin Hazzard's book American Sirens.
