= Remaking Cities Institute =

Urban design research center

The Remaking Cities Institute (RCI) is an urban design research center in Carnegie Mellon University's School of Architecture in Pittsburgh, Pennsylvania. It conducts international research in place-making, citizen participation planning processes, and sustainable development.

== Background ==
=== About the Institute ===
The Remaking Cities Institute (RCI) works to enhance the relationship between research, academic work, and urban development for both the Pittsburgh region and internationally. Current and recent projects include the role of 3D Visualization in Urban Design, 3D/Data Visualization for Urban Design and Planning (2019) as well as from partnering in community visioning, as in the Millvale Mobility: Connecting Millvale to the River and the Region (2018), and Johnstown Vision 2025: A Resilience Framework (2015) which contributed to an ongoing Johnstown Vision 2025 initiative. The connection between regional mobility and community design is also a research focus, including the Highway Corridor Transformation Research Study, and the ongoing Route 65 study. Sustainable urban infrastructure is a key focus as in the LED Street Light Research Project Part II: New Findings.

The RCI was started in response to the Carnegie Mellon School of Architecture's Urban Laboratory, an urban design studio that focuses on projects in the Pittsburgh region. The Urban Laboratory, founded by urban designer David Lewis, FAIA, engaged government officials, design professionals, community groups, and concerned citizens in a collective visioning process for numerous communities in the Pittsburgh region. Donald K. Carter, Institute Director through Spring 2019 and now Senior Research Fellow, edited and contributed to Remaking Post-Industrial Cities: Lessons from North America and Europe (Routledge, 2016). Ray Gastil AICP is a Senior Fellow, RCI, as of January 2023. From September 2019 through December 2022, he held the David Lewis/Heinz Endowments Directorship of Urban Design and Regional Engagement, as Director, Remaking Cities Institute. He served as Director, Department of City Planning, Pittsburgh (2014-2019). Earlier, he served as a director of planning offices in Seattle and NYC, and was the founding director of Van Alen Institute. Publications include "Complexity and Continuity in the Transformation of Pittsburgh's Rivers and Riverfronts," in River Cities, City Rivers (Harvard, 2018).

The RCI documents and researches best practices in urban design internationally and seeks to advance the theory and practice of urban design. The Institute regularly engages in funded research projects that test and evaluate innovative approaches to urban design, community development, and sustainable development.

The mission of the RCI includes: 1) international research in urbanism, 2) education in urbanism, and 3) Pittsburgh regional impact.
