= Kelly-Strayhorn Theater =

Performing arts center in Pennsylvania

Kelly Strayhorn Theater
- Regent Theater
- Interactive map of Kelly Strayhorn Theater
- Address: 5941 Penn Avenue; Pittsburgh, Pennsylvania; United States
- Capacity: 350
- Current use: Performing arts center

Construction
- Opened: 1914
- Architect: Harry S. Bair

Website
- Kelly-Strayhorn.org

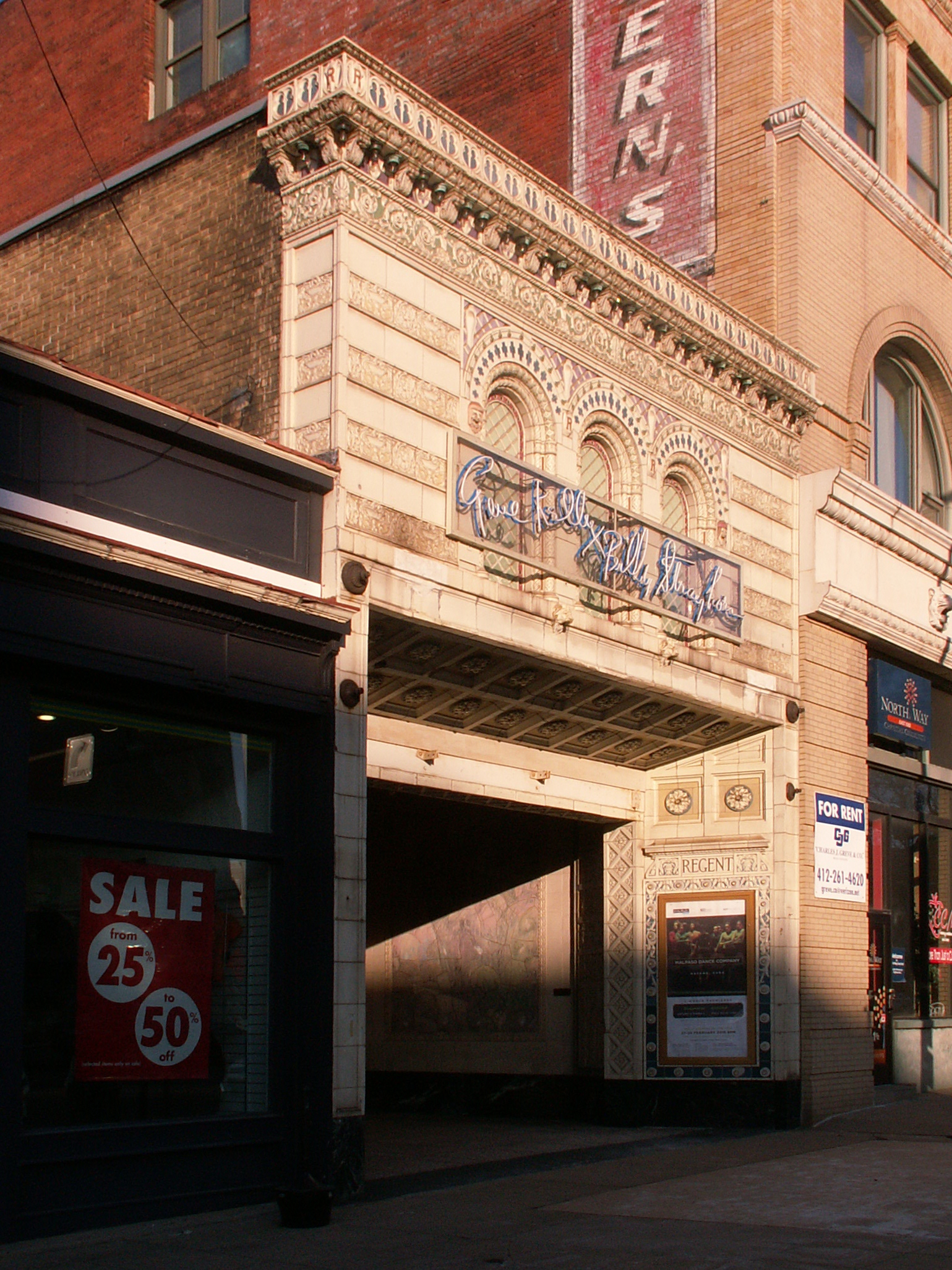
The front of the Kelly Strayhorn Theater on Penn Avenue

Kelly Strayhorn Theater is a performing arts center located at 5941 Penn Avenue in the East Liberty neighborhood of Pittsburgh, Pennsylvania. named in honor of Pittsburgh natives Gene Kelly and Billy Strayhorn.

The Kelly Strayhorn Theater produces arts engagement programming for young people and families through its presenting program, KSTPresents. Programming offerings that engage the community include The Alloy School, artSEEDS Student Matinees, and master classes and artist workshops.

Through the Producing Partners program, KST provides production, programming and fundraising support to local, community producers and artists who rent the venues for productions and events.

== History ==
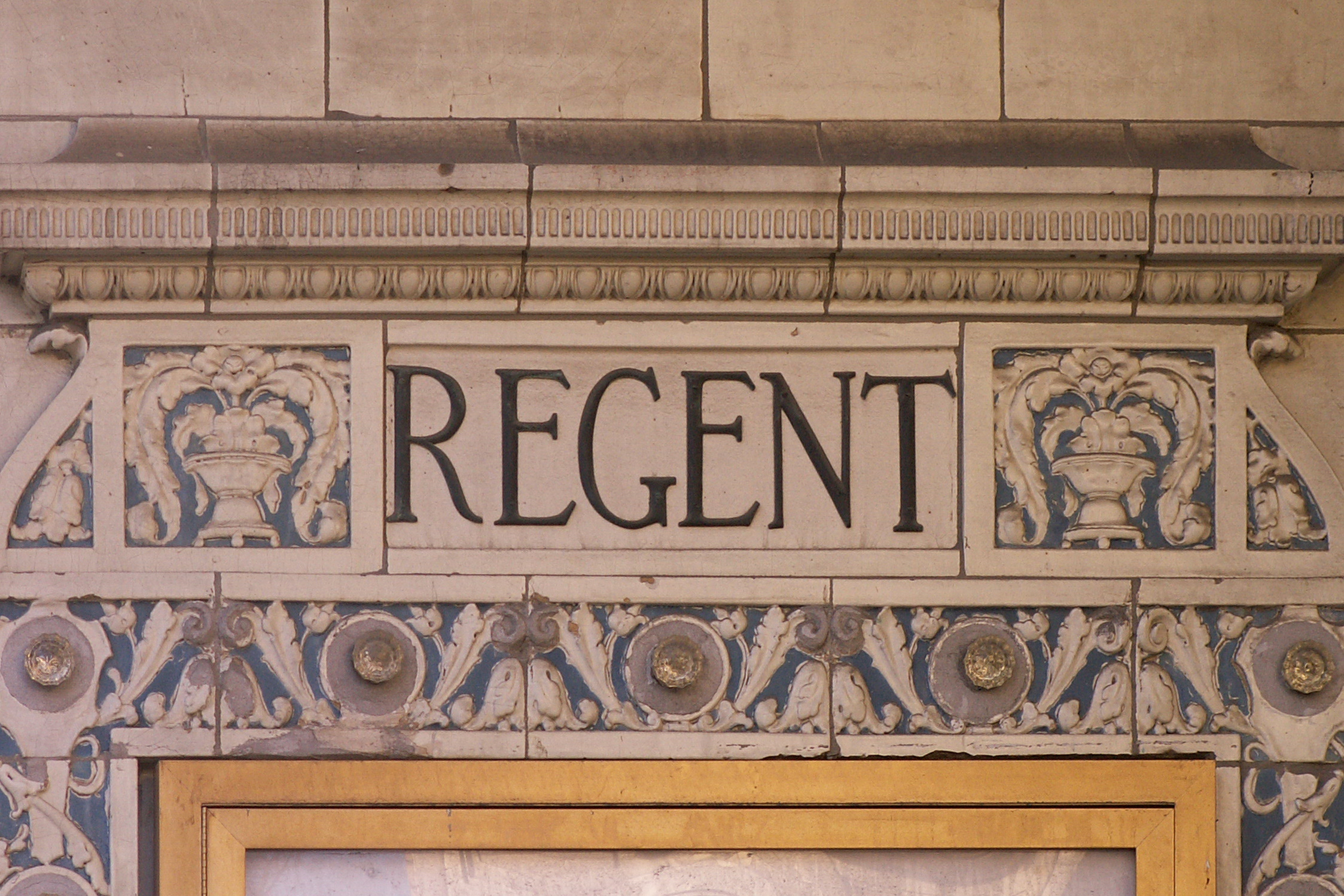
The name Regent still appears at the entrance to the theater.

The Kelly Strayhorn Theater originally opened in 1914 as the 1,100 seat Regent Theatre, a silent film movie house. Designed by architect Harry S. Bair, it featured a grand theater organ that provided live music to the films. The theater was closed by the 1950s but had a grand reopening as an 850-seat theater on July 18, 1965 following a $175,000 renovation under Ernest Stern's Associated Theaters.

In October 1979, the Regent again closed. In the mid 1980s, the theater underwent renovations and reopened in 1995. The Regent largely served as a concert space before closing again in 1997. The current theater reopened in 2001 and was renamed to honor Gene Kelly and Billy Strayhorn. A commemorative “Walk of Stars” (curated by Teresa Trich) recognizing artists, friends, fans, and family members of the theater was installed at its entrance. The theater started original programming in 2008 and merged with Dance Alloy in the nearby Friendship neighborhood in the fall of 2011.

== 2008-today ==
In 2008, janera solomon was appointed as the theater's executive director. Under her leadership, the theater expanded to increase its original programming and funding. Kelly Strayhorn Theater is now recognized as a progressive cultural center. Its programs, such as the newMoves Contemporary Dance Festival, which features new work in dance, and World Stage, which supports new performances by international artists, have helped the theater gain local and national recognition.

Artists presented by KST include: Kyle Abraham, Suli Holum, Jaamil Kosoko, Camille A. Brown, Vanessa German, Kate Watson Wallace, Bill Shannon, Luke Murphy, and Stacey Pearl, all of whom have had extensive creative or production residencies in support of new work at KST.

In addition, KST Presents includes support for emerging artists in film, poetry and visual arts: Chris Ivey, Alisha Wormsley, and Joy KMT.

All of KST's programming is realized in partnership with community partners located in and around the city of Pittsburgh. The theater itself serves as a cultural hub for the Pittsburgh neighborhood of East Liberty and Pittsburgh's East End.

In 2015, the theater instituted system called “Pay What Makes You Happy” which allows patrons to set their own price for all KST Presents performances and events.

== Facilities ==
=== The Kelly Strayhorn Theater ===
The Kelly Strayhorn Theater, built in 1914 and originally the Regent Theater, is located in the heart of East Liberty.

The Kelly Strayhorn Theater is a performance space that seats 350. The theater's lobby space hosts events, receptions and pre- and post-show conversations.

=== The Alloy Studios ===
The Alloy Studios (formerly Dance Alloy) is located on Penn Avenue. Two dance and performance studio spaces provide a place for creation, education, and ongoing partnership programs.

The Alloy Studios opened in 1995 as Dance Alloy. The construction of the multiuse space was a part of larger revitalization efforts in Pittsburgh's Garfield neighborhood. The space is equipped with two professional dance studios with marley-sprung floors.

== Programming ==
KST Presents is the theater's original programming series featuring dance, theater, film, performance art, and literary art performances that provide a multicultural experience.

=== FreshWorks Artists in Residence ===
Fresh Works is KST's creative learning program for Pittsburgh-based artists. In the program, artists receive 80 hours at The Alloy Studios to research, explore, play, and create a work-in-progress performance for audience input.

=== newMoves Contemporary Dance Festival ===
newMoves is an annual festival for contemporary dance making that began in 2009. newMoves provides opportunities for dance artists to share new ideas and new work and engage in dialogue with audiences. The festival features local, national, and international artists. Programming for the conference consists of performances, dance parties, creative workshops, classes and conversations with artists.

=== My People Film Series ===
An annual program created in honor of Billy Strayhorn, which includes film screenings, performances, and discussions exploring the life experiences of queer people of color.

=== SUNSTAR Festival ===
A festival featuring contemporary independent female artists across various disciplines. Events occurring during the course of the festival include concerts, performances, talks, workshops, parties and more. Past festivals have included visiting artists Rhiannon Giddens of the Carolina Chocolate Drops, author Rebecca Walker, and composer Samita Sinha, as well as Pittsburgh artists Joy Ike, Dr. Goddess, Shaina Wallace, SolSis, Stacyee Pearl, and Bhangra Bash with DJ Rekha.

=== Annual community celebrations ===
Recurring events include Suite Life: A Tribute to Billy Strayhorn, Full Bloom Summer Dance Party, and East Liberty Live!

The Kelly Strayhorn Theater hosts a number of family-friendly events, such as the Let's Move! Family Dance Party, Halloween Mayhem, and East Liberty Celebrates MLK Day.

== Education and community outreach ==
=== The Alloy School ===
The Kelly Strayhorn Theater merged with the Pittsburgh Dance Alloy in 2011.

As a part of the merge, the Kelly Strayhorn Theater continued Pittsburgh Dance Alloy's community education program, The Alloy School.

The Alloy School is a creative and non-competitive community for children, families, and adults. The Alloy School offers movement-focused classes that include pre-ballet, African dance, creative movement, hip-hop, family yoga, and acting.

== Residencies ==
=== Creative Community ===
Creative Community residency projects support the creation of new works built around the neighborhood context, history, legacy, and character.

Artists in these residencies offer active public engagement activities, including community meals and gatherings, conversations, workshops and master classes. The residency brings residents, neighborhood organizers, local agencies and other partners to engage with artists.

=== Penn Avenue Creative ===
An accelerator program for emerging artists and entrepreneurs, Penn Avenue Creative offers emerging creative leaders network development and mentorship. Members of the residency cohort work to catalyze sites along the Penn Avenue Corridor, the street in which the Kelly Strayhorn Theater and Alloy Studios are located.

=== Futuremakers ===
Futuremakers is an interactive series of events that invites key leaders, community members, and stakeholders to engage with Penn Avenue Creative fellows around the future of Penn Avenue. The Futuremakers Symposium takes place in May and invites local and national leaders to discuss building and maintaining community in neighborhoods undergoing revitalization.

== See also ==
Theatre in Pittsburgh
