= Professional ice hockey =

Ice hockey in which participants are paid to play

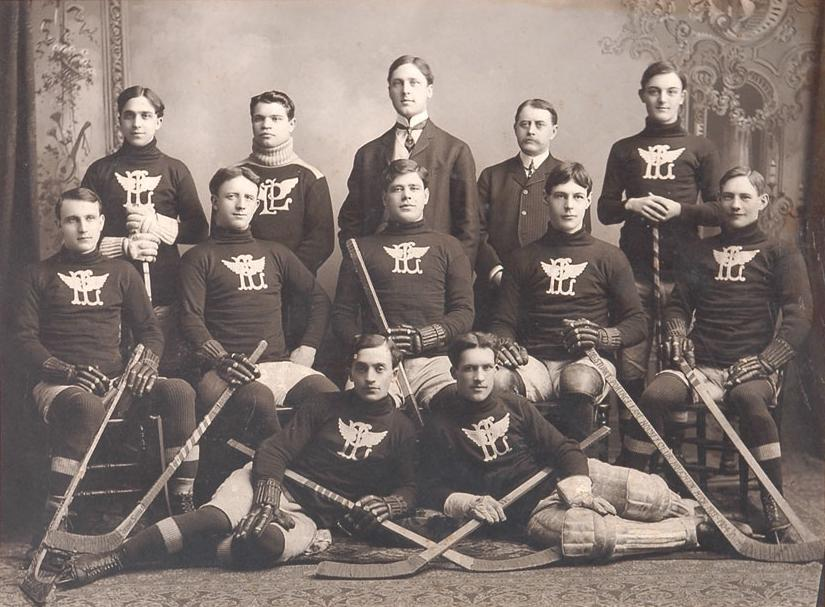
Portage Lake Hockey Club in 1904, one of the first professional hockey clubs.

Professional ice hockey (hockey) is the competition of ice hockey in which participants are paid to play. Professional competition began in North America in the United States—in Pennsylvania and Michigan—and in Canada around 1900. Professional ice hockey expanded across Canada and the United States and eventually to many other countries. There are major leagues around the world, including the National Hockey League in North America, the Kontinental Hockey League in Europe and Asia, and the Swedish Hockey League in Europe, as well as minor leagues such as the American Hockey League and ECHL in North America, and the Ligue Nord-Américaine de Hockey in Canada. High-level professional hockey is also present in Germany, the Czech Republic, Slovakia, Finland and Switzerland; professional hockey is also played in many other countries, as diverse as Ukraine, the United Kingdom, Austria, Australia and Japan. The major professional women's league is the Professional Women's Hockey League, which began play in 2024.

== Development ==
Professional hockey developed in the United States and Canada around the turn of the 20th century. Houghton, Michigan, was formally considered the "birthplace of professional hockey"; however, recent investigations have proven otherwise, beginning with the establishment of the International Professional Hockey League, the first fully professional hockey league, in Houghton in 1904 following conversations between James R. Dee from Houghton, Michigan and representatives of the Western Pennsylvania Hockey League, a semi-professional hockey league started in Pittsburgh, Pennsylvania in 1896. The International Professional Hockey League began play in 1904 with teams from Houghton, Michigan (Houghton-Portage Lakes), Pittsburgh, Pennsylvania (Pittsburgh Professionals), Calumet, Michigan (Calumet-Laurium Miners), Sault Ste. Marie, Ontario (Sault Ste. Marie Marlboros), and Sault Ste. Marie, Michigan (Michigan Soo Indians).

Prior to 1904, playing for pay was not favored by major hockey circuits, as they were established as purely amateur organizations. Players who were found to be paid were marked as professional and were banned by leagues such as the Ontario Hockey Association (OHA), Canadian teams were prohibited from playing in Pittsburgh, and the Canadian teams who played games against professional teams from Northern Michigan were banished by the OHA, including the two teams from Sault Ste. Marie, the Sault Ste. Marie Marlboros and Michigan Soo Indians in 1903-04. Some banned players in Ontario considered starting a professional team in 1898, and there was a proposal to start a professional league in western Ontario in 1899, but professional hockey did not take off in Canada until 1907 with the establishment of the Ontario Professional Hockey League.

The earliest known instance of hockey players playing publicly for pay occurred in Pittsburgh, Pennsylvania when a 1902 investigation by the Ontario Hockey Association (OHA) revealed that players on Pittsburgh-based teams received payment in 1901 and 1902, leading the OHA to ban any club from Pittsburgh from participating in their association, claiming there was "ample and undeniable proof" that clubs in Pittsburgh were "purely professional, paying straight salaries to their players." The 1903-04 Portage Lakes Hockey Club is regarded as the first team to pay each of the players on the team, while players in prior years in the Western Pennsylvania Hockey League were compensated via a mix of a small monetary payment and jobs in the Pittsburgh community, with the 30 players of the then four-team Western Pennsylvania Hockey League each receiving a weekly salary ranging from $10 (equivalent to $358 in 2025) to $20 (equivalent to $717 in 2025) per week in January of 1903, depending upon their agreements with James Wallace Conant, which resulted in the Ontario Hockey Association considering each of these teams as a "purely professional team".

Beginning with the start of 1904 season the semi-professional Pittsburgh-based teams of the Western Pennsylvania Hockey League consolidated to become Pittsburgh Professionals and joined with the Houghton-Portage Lakes to become two of the original five teams of the International Professional Hockey League, marking the beginning of fully professional hockey in North America.

== By country ==
=== Canada ===
Professional leagues emerged from amateur leagues. In 1904, the predominantly U.S.-based International Professional Hockey League (IPHL) hosted the first Canadian professional team, the Canadian Soo. The league hired many amateur players away from Canada, causing the amateur leagues to convert to all-out professionalism or allow professional players in order to compete for the top players. The first Canadian professional league was the Manitoba Professional Hockey League (MPHL), formed in 1905 from member teams of the amateur Manitoba Hockey Association. The Eastern Canada Amateur Hockey Association (ECAHA), formed from prior amateur hockey leagues, emerged in 1906. The ECAHA allowed teams to have professional players from the start, despite its name. In 1907, the Ontario Professional Hockey League was formed. The competition for players increased salaries, a factor in the demise of the IPHL in 1907 and the temporary end of professional hockey in the United States. In 1908, the ECAHA became fully professional, as the ECAHA's amateur teams separated from the league and competed for the new Allan Cup, a new challenge cup instituted for amateur teams. The ECAHA, now fully professional, renamed itself the ECHA. The MPHL folded in 1909, the OPHL in 1908, leaving the ECHA as the only 'elite' professional league in Canada.

In northern Ontario, silver mining had made small towns affluent, and mines in the area hired professional players for their ice hockey teams. By 1910, several teams in the area had hired enough professional players from the ECHA, that the teams, notably the Renfrew Creamery Kings, wanted to join the ECHA and compete for the Stanley Cup. Rebuffed by the ECHA, the mine owners formed the National Hockey Association (NHA) in 1910, splitting the ECHA's teams between the Canadian Hockey Association and the NHA. The CHA dissolved after less than a month, with some teams absorbed by the NHA. After one season of extravagant salaries, the NHA team owners imposed a salary cap, causing dissension amongst the players, and closed most of the teams in mining towns.

In 1911, Lester and Frank Patrick, who had played in the NHA, formed the rival Pacific Coast Hockey Association in British Columbia and took the opportunity to sign many of the NHA's players, notably Cyclone Taylor. In 1912, the NHA expanded west to Toronto, becoming a six-team league from Toronto to Quebec City. While the leagues competed for players, competition for the Stanley Cup brought them together for annual playoffs, starting in 1915. In November 1917, the NHA itself suspended operations and several NHA owners formed the National Hockey League (NHL) following a dispute between NHA team owners. The new league began play in December that year with four Canadian teams. The NHL continued the annual Stanley Cup playoffs with the PCHA.

In the west, the Western Canada Hockey League was formed in 1921 from existing teams in Alberta and Saskatchewan. The annual Stanley Cup playoffs now became a three-way championship, alternating in location between the west and the east. The PCHA would merge with the WCHL in 1924 to form the Western Hockey League before the league ceased operations in 1926. The NHL, having expanded to the U.S.A. and now with ten teams, bought out the players' contracts of the WHL and took control of the Stanley Cup, forming Canadian and American divisions; it also brought in one WHL team, the Victoria Cougars, and relocated it to the U.S. to eventually become the modern Detroit Red Wings.

The NHL lost Canadian teams in the 1920s and 1930s, leading to a rise in senior-level amateur teams and leagues in cities such as Quebec City and Ottawa, former NHL cities. After World War II, several of these teams became professional in the Quebec Hockey League, which included several stars such as Jean Beliveau and Willie O'Ree. In the 1950s, with the rise of NHL television broadcasts, such as those on Hockey Night in Canada, attendance suffered and the minor professional leagues folded or merged to survive. A new Western Hockey League was formed on the west coast with teams in several cities including Vancouver. The WHL's Vancouver Canucks organization would join the NHL in 1970. Since the demise of the QHL, the American Hockey League (AHL) has had Canadian teams, starting with the Quebec Aces.

In 1972, the World Hockey Association was formed with professional teams in Edmonton, Ottawa, Quebec City and Winnipeg. Ottawa relocated to Toronto after one season, but the other teams survived until the WHA merged with the NHL in 1979, with Edmonton, Quebec City and Winnipeg joined the NHL, along with the Hartford, Connecticut-based New England Whalers, which joined the NHL as the Hartford Whalers. The inclusion of all three Canadian WHA teams was a key point of contention in merger talks between the NHL and WHA, and only after the NHL agreed to that stipulation was agreed upon did the merger happen. In 1980, the Atlanta franchise moved to Calgary. In the 1990s, the Quebec and Winnipeg franchises relocated to the U.S., to Denver and Phoenix respectively, while Ottawa rejoined the NHL in 1992; the NHL returned to Winnipeg in 2011, and a proposal to return to Quebec currently sits in purgatory.

On February 16, 2005, the NHL became the first major professional team sport in North America to cancel an entire season because of a labor dispute. Play resumed again in the fall of 2005. During the dispute, controversy arose over the decision not to award the Stanley Cup; some considered this decision a violation of the terms of the Stanley Cup's handover ("Deed of Gift") to the NHL. Following a legal challenge, it was agreed that the Cup's trustees could award the Cup to a non-NHL team, although this did not actually occur.

=== Czechoslovakia ===
In Czechoslovakia, the Czechoslovak Extraliga was the elite ice hockey league in Czechoslovakia from 1930 until 1993, when the country split into the Czech Republic and Slovakia.

In the Czech Republic, the Czech Extraliga is rooted in the Czechoslovak Extraliga. The Czech Extraliga was spun off in 1993 following the administrative break-up of Czechoslovakia. The Czech Extraliga is the highest-level ice hockey league in the Czech Republic. The name of the league is leased a general sponsor and changes frequently. In the 2003-04, 2004–05 and 2005–06 seasons it was known as the Tipsport Extraliga; for 2001-01 and 2001-02 it was called the Český Telecom Extraliga, and in 1999-00 the Staropramen Extraliga. During the 2006-07 season it was known as the O2 Extraliga. Hockey Club Lev Praha (stylized as HC LEV Praha) is a professional ice hockey team located in Prague, Czech Republic, which debuts in the Kontinental Hockey League (KHL) in 2012–13.

In Slovakia, the Slovak Extraliga is the highest-level ice hockey league in Slovakia. The name of the league is leased to sponsor and changes frequently. From 1993/94 to 1997/98 season, it was called Extraliga, then the name changed to West Extraliga until the end of 2000/01 season. In 2001/02, its name was Boss Extraliga. Since 2002/03 season to 2004/05, the name changed to ST Extraliga and in 2005/06 to T-Com Extraliga. From January 16, 2007, the name changed to Slovnaft Extraliga when a general sponsor agreement with Slovnaft was signed. The agreement is valid until the end of 2007/08 season. The Slovak Extraliga is also rooted in the Czechoslovak Extraliga. The 1993/94 season was the first season of Slovak Extraliga as Czechoslovakia split into the Czech Republic and Slovakia on January 1, 1993. Hockey Club Slovan Bratislava (Slovak: Hokejový klub Slovan Bratislava) is a professional ice hockey club based in Bratislava, Slovakia. In 2012, they left the Slovak Extraliga and joined the international Kontinental Hockey League (KHL). The club has won eight Slovak championships (most recently in 2012) and one Czechoslovak championship (1979).

=== Finland ===
In Finland, SM-liiga is the top professional ice hockey league in Finland and is regarded as one of the top leagues in Europe. It was constituted in 1975 to replace SM-sarja, which was fundamentally an amateur league. SM-liiga has an agreement of cooperation with Finnish ice hockey federation Suomen Jääkiekkoliitto. SM is a common abbreviation for Suomen mestaruus, "Finnish championship". At the moment, there are 14 teams. SM-liiga was closed in 2000 so that no team can be relegated to or promoted from the lower leagues without approval of the board of SM-liiga. The board have committed themselves to promote the first winner of Mestis (the second highest competition) that meets certain standards. The Finnish ice hockey championship has been played since 1928.

=== Germany ===
In Germany, the Deutsche Eishockey Liga (German Hockey League, shortname DEL) is a German high-calibre ice hockey league, and has the highest number of American and Canadian players overseas. It was formed as a replacement for the Bundesliga. It dates back to 1958.

=== Soviet Union and successors ===
The highest league in the Soviet Union was the Soviet Championship League, founded in 1946. This evolved into an elite league with a talent level comparable to the NHL. However, it was always considered an "amateur" league, rather than professional. This was because all elite athletes in the Soviet Union were conscripted into the Red Army, Red Air Force or other national institutions. Technically they were paid for their military service, and not for their play as athletes. This allowed them compete at the Olympic Games without violating the International Olympic Committee's amateur-only rules of the era.

Throughout the history of the Soviet league, Red Army-affiliated CSKA Moscow dominated, winning 32 of the 46 championship seasons.

The Soviet League's talent level was severely diminished following the fall of communism when most elite players moved to the NHL in search of higher pay. The league also changed its name to the CIS Championship in 1991-1992, and then to the International Hockey League from 1992 to 1996. After the communist era ended, the league became explicitly professional.

By 1996, most of former Soviet republics had created their own national leagues: including the Estonian Ice Hockey Association, Kazakhstani Championship, Latvian Hockey League, Lithuania Hockey League, and Ukrainian Major League. The remnant Russian Federation-based teams created the Russian Super League.

The Russian Pro Hockey League's "Super League" was the highest level of play in Russia from 1996 to 2008. During the 2000s (decade) the calibre of play and the league economics recovered as the Russian economy did. Before the 2008-09 season the RSL was reformed into the Kontinental Hockey League which includes teams from several other former Soviet republics (Belarus, Kazakhstan, Latvia, Czech Republic, Slovakia, Ukraine) and plans to expand further.

=== Sweden ===
In Sweden, the Swedish Hockey League (SHL) is the highest-level professional ice hockey league. It is generally regarded as one of the top leagues of Europe, and one of the Swedish major professional sports league. SHL, or the Swedish Elite League, which it is often unofficially called in English, is composed of 14 teams. The first season under the former name Elitserien was played in 1975–76. The Swedish ice hockey championships has been played in various forms since 1922.

=== Switzerland ===
In Switzerland, the Nationalliga A (German), or Ligue Nationale A (French), or Lega Nazionale A (Italian) is the top tier of the Nationalliga or Ligue Nationale or Lega Nazionale, the main professional ice hockey league in Switzerland. It is the oldest league remaining today, dating to 1916.

=== United Kingdom ===
Between the wars, British ice hockey grew rapidly with new ice rinks and an influx of Canadian players. A European competition was instituted, and in the 1936 Winter Olympics at Garmisch, Germany, Great Britain won the gold medal, imposing the first ever Olympic defeat on the Canadians. However, because of the disruption of World War II and a lack of suitable venues afterwards the sport faded rapidly.

As of 2012, the ten-team, two-division professional Elite Ice Hockey League is the highest level of competition in the United Kingdom and features teams from each of the four Home Nations.

=== United States ===
Much as was the case of the concurrent development of professional gridiron football, the Pittsburgh, Pennsylvania metropolitan area was one of the first areas to promote a professional ice hockey team. The Western Pennsylvania Hockey League began hiring professional players in 1902 and acted as a pro–am league. This league joined with teams in Michigan and Ontario to form the International Professional Hockey League in 1904, with Houghton, Michigan dentist Jack Gibson its founder. While this league had folded by 1907, it was the start of professional hockey. The United States would continue to see professional hockey with teams from the PCHL, beginning with the Portland Rosebuds, followed by a Seattle-based franchise a year later. When the Boston Bruins joined the NHL in 1924, the United States was finally represented in the league. It would continue to grow in the NHL until a peak in the 2000s (decade), when 24 of the NHL's 30 teams were in the United States (the loss of the Atlanta Thrashers to Winnipeg in 2011 reduced this number to 23; it returned to 24 American teams when the Vegas Golden Knights joined in 2017). The NHL reached a higher peak when the Seattle Kraken joined the league in 2021-22 as the 25th American team. There are several other pro leagues in the US as well; as of 2019 these include the AHL, ECHL, SPHL, and FPHL. The AHL and ECHL are official minor leagues to the NHL, with the ECHL subservient to the AHL; the FPHL and SPHL operate as low-level independents.

The NHL is considered one of the four major professional sports leagues of the United States. It is historically most popular in areas near the Canada–US border and along the Eastern Seaboard of the United States.

== International ==
There is no single global championship for professional ice hockey. The most elite North American teams compete for the Stanley Cup as their championship. Created in 1892, the Stanley Cup was originally an amateur trophy. Starting in 1907, professionals were allowed to compete for it. Teams from several leagues played for the Stanley Cup before 1926, since which time the cup's trustees have ceded control of the trophy to the National Hockey League (NHL). The terms of the NHL's control over the trophy extended only so long as the NHL remained the undisputed, most dominant professional hockey league in the world, a distinction that arguably was voided in the 1970s after Russian teams played, and often defeated, NHL teams but has not been formally challenged since that time.

The most elite European clubs have competed in the Europa Cup from 1965 to 1997, the European Hockey League from 1996 to 2000, the IIHF European Champions Cup 2005 to 2008 and the Champions Hockey League in 2008. The Champions Hockey League returned for the 2014-15 season and has since been held yearly. The most successful North American team is the Montreal Canadiens who have won 24 Stanley Cups, the most successful European club is HC CSKA Moscow which has won 20 European Cups.

Teams from North American and Europe do not regularly compete against each other in "friendlies" as do soccer clubs, although efforts to expand intercontinental play have increased since the new 2000 millennium. The opportunities for fans and media to compare levels of play between the continents were especially limited during the Cold War since many of Europe’s best clubs were behind the Iron Curtain. After the success of the Summit Series which featured the Canadian and Soviet national teams, there was a demand for more international hockey at the club level. It has also proved that Soviet hockey was at a comparable level to the NHL. This led to the Super Series which from 1975 to 1991 featured an annual tour of North America by a Soviet hockey club. The first Super Series featured CSKA Moscow against the Montreal Canadiens on New Year’s Eve 1975, in what was described in the press as a de facto world championship. The game ended as a 3-3 draw but was hailed as one of the greatest games ever played. The following week CSKA played and lost to the two-time defending Stanley Cup champion Philadelphia Flyers in a game infamous for its roughness. Subsequent Super Series produced more close results, but generally favoured the Soviet sides. However, following the fall of communism, many elite players from the Soviet Union and Eastern Bloc countries went to the NHL for higher pay. The NHL became de facto the world’s most elite league as the quality of play in European leagues suffered. European leagues have, however, benefited from the frequent labor disputes in the NHL (it has locked out its players three times in an eighteen-year span), picking up players who are barred from NHL play due to lockouts.

Between 2000 and 2003, several NHL teams travelled outside North America to play exhibition games against some Swedish and one Finnish ice hockey teams. This series was known as the NHL Challenge.

In 2008, the former Russian Super League was refounded as the Kontinental Hockey League, expanded into Belarus, Latvia, and Kazakhstan, and encouraged its clubs to aggressively seek talented players (sometimes at the expense of the NHL), prompting the media to speculate about eventual KHL challenge to the NHL dominance of international hockey.

Also in 2008, the new Champions Hockey League was created to provide an elite tournament for the best teams in Europe. The winner of the Champions Hockey League will face an NHL challenger each year in the Victoria Cup providing a regular contest between NHL and European teams since the end of the Super Series in 1991. The Champions League was suspended for the 2009-10 season due to withdrawal of sponsors such as Gazprom.

In 2009, KHL and Gazprom executive Alexander Medvedev proposed merging the KHL into a new pan-European league called United Hockey Europe.

Since 2007, the NHL has operated the NHL Premiere series, which brings a limited number of NHL teams (usually four) to Europe to compete in exhibition games against both each other and local professional teams. The NHL teams have won a large majority of the games against European clubs.

== Women's hockey ==
In North America, professional women's hockey developed much later than in the men's game, and has seen starts and stops. The Canadian Women's Hockey League, founded in 2014, did not pay salaries, but did pay stipends and bonuses. It folded in 2019 due to financial instability. The National Women's Hockey League (NWHL), the first women's league to pay salaries, was established in the United States in 2015 and expanded into Canada in 2020. However, hundreds of prominent women's players, including Canadian and American Olympians, founded the Professional Women's Hockey Players' Association and opted to boycott existing leagues in pursuit of a unified, financially stable professional league. In 2023, the NWHL—rebranded as the Premier Hockey Federation in 2021—was purchased and ultimately dissolved as part of the foundation of the Professional Women's Hockey League (PWHL), the unified league many players had been working towards. The league debuted in January 2024.

== See also ==
- List of ice hockey leagues
