= 1912–13 Toronto Tecumsehs season =

1912–13 Toronto Tecumsehs
- 1912–13 record: 7–13–0
- Goals for: 59
- Goals against: 98

Team information
- Coach: Billy Nicholson
- Arena: Arena Gardens

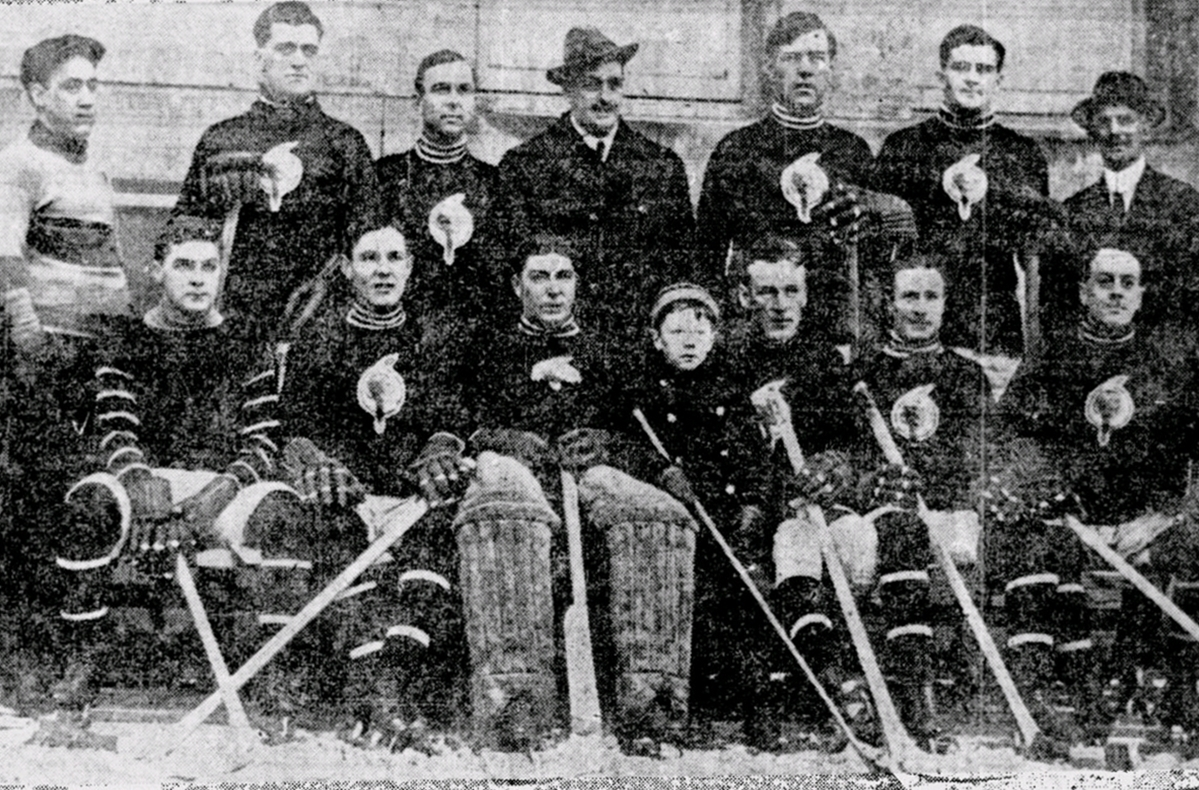
First team picture of the Tecumsehs team. Standing (left to right): Tom Daly (trainer), George McNamara, Horace Gaul, Cap Williams, Con Corbeau, Howard McNamara, Billie Pop. Sitting: Alex Nicholson, Teddy Oke, W. Nicholson (manager), the mascot, Art Throop, Fred Strike, Ernie Liffiton.

The 1912–13 Toronto Tecumsehs season was the first season of the Toronto Tecumsehs professional ice hockey team in the National Hockey Association (NHA).

== Team business ==
Before the season started, the franchise was transferred to the Tecumseh amateur ice hockey organization after a previous sale from Ambrose O'Brien of the NHA failed. The team was placed under the management of goaltender Billy Nicholson, who operated as manager, coach and player.

== Regular season ==
The team's first goal was scored by Harry Smith in the first period of their first game against the Montreal Wanderers.

The team placed in sixth place in the league and failed to qualify for the playoffs.

=== Standings ===
National Hockey Association
	GP	W	L	T	GF	GA
Quebec Bulldogs	20	16	4	0	112	75
Montreal Wanderers	20	10	10	0	93	90
Toronto Hockey Club	20	9	11	0	86	95
Montreal Canadiens	20	9	11	0	83	81
Ottawa Senators	20	9	11	0	87	81
Toronto Tecumsehs	20	7	13	0	59	98

Note: W = Wins, L = Losses, T = Ties, GF= Goals For, GA = Goals Against

== Schedule and results ==
=== Results ===
Month	Day	Visitor	Score	Home	Score
Dec.	28	Wanderers	7	Tecumsehs	4
Jan.	1	Canadiens	4	Tecumsehs	3
Jan.	4	Tecumsehs	5	Quebec	3
Jan.	8	Ottawa	1	Tecumsehs	4
Jan.	11	Toronto	2	Tecumsehs	5
Jan.	15	Tecumsehs	1	Toronto	6
Jan.	18	Quebec	4	Tecumsehs	2
Jan.	22	Tecumsehs	4	Ottawa	3 (7' overtime)
Jan.	25	Tecumsehs	4	Canadiens	5 (17' overtime)
Jan.	29	Tecumsehs	2	Wanderers	6
Feb.	1‡	Quebec	5	Tecumsehs	4 (4' overtime)
Feb.	5‡	Tecumsehs	5	Canadiens	4
Feb.	8	Tecumsehs	2	Wanderers	1
Feb.	12	Tecumsehs	0	Ottawa	11
Feb.	15	Tecumsehs	0	Quebec	8
Feb.	19	Toronto	7	Tecumsehs	3
Feb.	22	Tecumsehs	3	Toronto	5
Feb.	26	Ottawa	3	Tecumsehs	4
Mar.	1	Canadiens	3	Tecumsehs	1
Mar.	5	Wanderers	10	Tecumsehs	3

‡ Played with rover (7 man hockey)

Source: Coleman (1966)
