= Con Corbeau =

Canadian ice hockey player

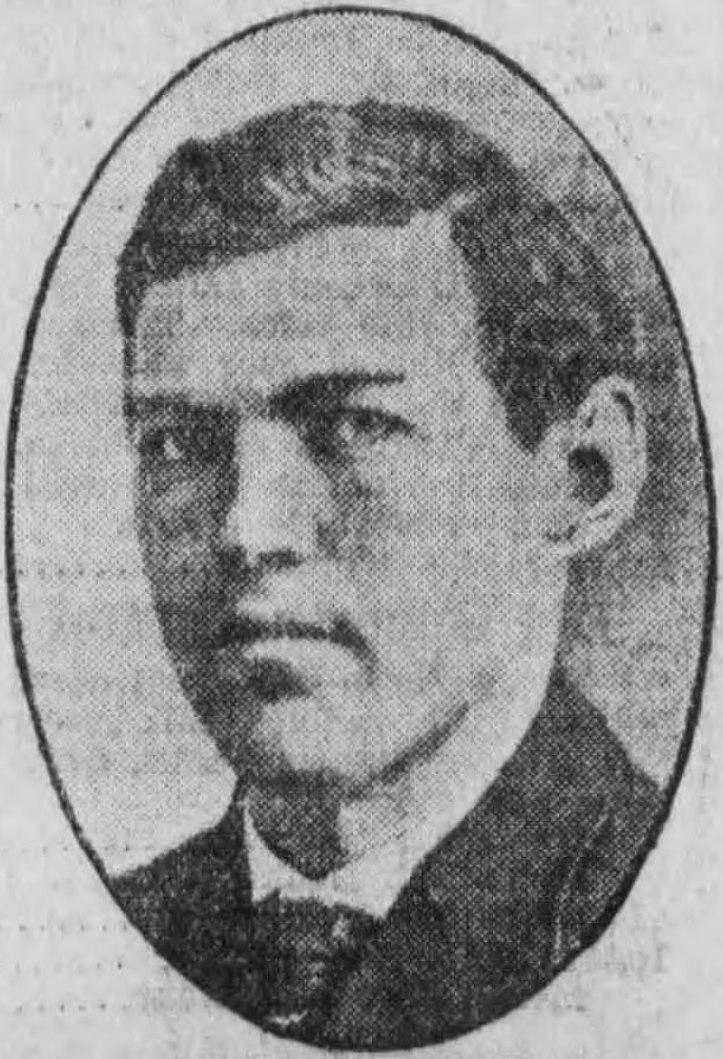
- Corbeau c. 1913
- Born: May 8, 1885 Penetanguishene, Ontario, Canada
- Died: June 14, 1920 (aged 35) Penetanguishene, Ontario, Canada
- Height: 6 ft 1 in (185 cm)
- Weight: 225 lb (102 kg; 16 st 1 lb)
- Position: Defence
- Shot: Right
- Played for: Pittsburgh Professionals; Calumet Miners; Canadian Soo; Portage Lakes Hockey Club; Toronto Professional Hockey Club; Pittsburgh Athletic Club; Haileybury Comets; Berlin Dutchmen; Toronto Tecumsehs; Toronto Blueshirts; Glace Bay Miners
- Playing career: 1905–1915

Henry John "Harry, Con" Corbeau (May 8, 1885 – June 1, 1920) was a Canadian professional ice hockey defenceman in the National Hockey Association for the Toronto Blueshirts. Corbeau was a member of the Blueshirts when they won the Stanley Cup in 1914. Corbeau's brother Bert also played professional ice hockey. Both Corbeau brothers are distant cousins of Ted Lindsay.

== Playing career ==
Born in Penetanguishene, Ontario, Corbeau played senior ice hockey with Toronto St. Georges and Victoria Harbour, before signing as a professional with the Pittsburgh Professionals of the International Professional Hockey League in 1905. In one of the earliest trades of a player, Pittsburgh traded him to the Calumet Miners in exchange for the Miners' vote to reinstate Hod Stuart. Corbeau played for both Calumet and the Canadian Soo teams that season as well as Pittsburgh. The following season, he signed with the Portage Lakes Hockey Club but was released and finished the season with Calumet. In 1907, he signed with the Toronto Pros of the OPHL, and played in their unsuccessful challenge of the Montreal Wanderers for the Stanley Cup.

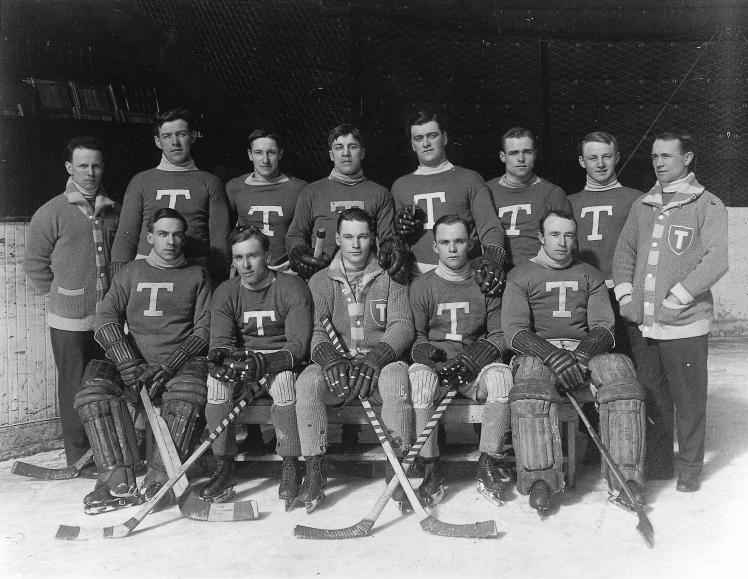
Corbeau, second from left in the back row, with the 1913–14 Toronto Blueshirts.

Corbeau signed for the next season with Pittsburgh Athletic Club of the Western Pennsylvania Hockey League in 1908, but jumped his contract to re-sign with Toronto. Later that season, he jumped his contract with Toronto to play for the Haileybury Comets. In 1909, he re-signed with Haileybury for the new NHA, but he did not play a game. The following year, he stayed with Haileybury went it returned to the TPHL, although he finished the season with the Berlin Dutchmen of the OPHL. In 1912, he joined the new Toronto Tecumsehs of the NHA. He moved the following season to the Toronto Blueshirts and was a member of their Stanley Cup-winning squad.

Corbeau played his final season of 1914–15 with the Glace Bay Miners of the Nova Scotia Eastern Pro League. He coached after his playing days with Port Arthur Columbus Club before returning home to Penetanguishene, and died in 1920 of internal bleeding of his heart.
