= Ed Longfellow =

Canadian ice hockey player

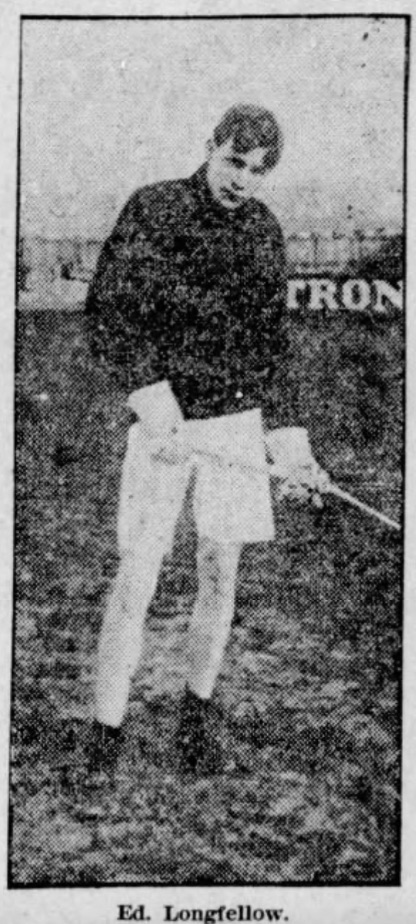
- Longfellow as a lacrosse player in Vancouver in 1910
- Born: April 28, 1887; Sherbrooke, Quebec, Canada
- Died: October 15, 1959 (aged 72) near Sundridge, Ontario, Canada
- Height: 5 ft 10 in (178 cm)
- Weight: 170 lb (77 kg; 12 st 2 lb)
- Position: Forward
- Played for: Toronto Tecumsehs
- Playing career: 1907–1913

Eustis Fremont Longfellow (April 28, 1887 – October 15, 1959) was a Canadian professional lacrosse and ice hockey player. He played with the Toronto Tecumsehs of the National Hockey Association during the 1912–13 season. He also played lacrosse both in Vancouver and Toronto. He died in October 1959 while hunting near Sundridge, Ontario.
