= Fred Strike =

Canadian ice hockey player

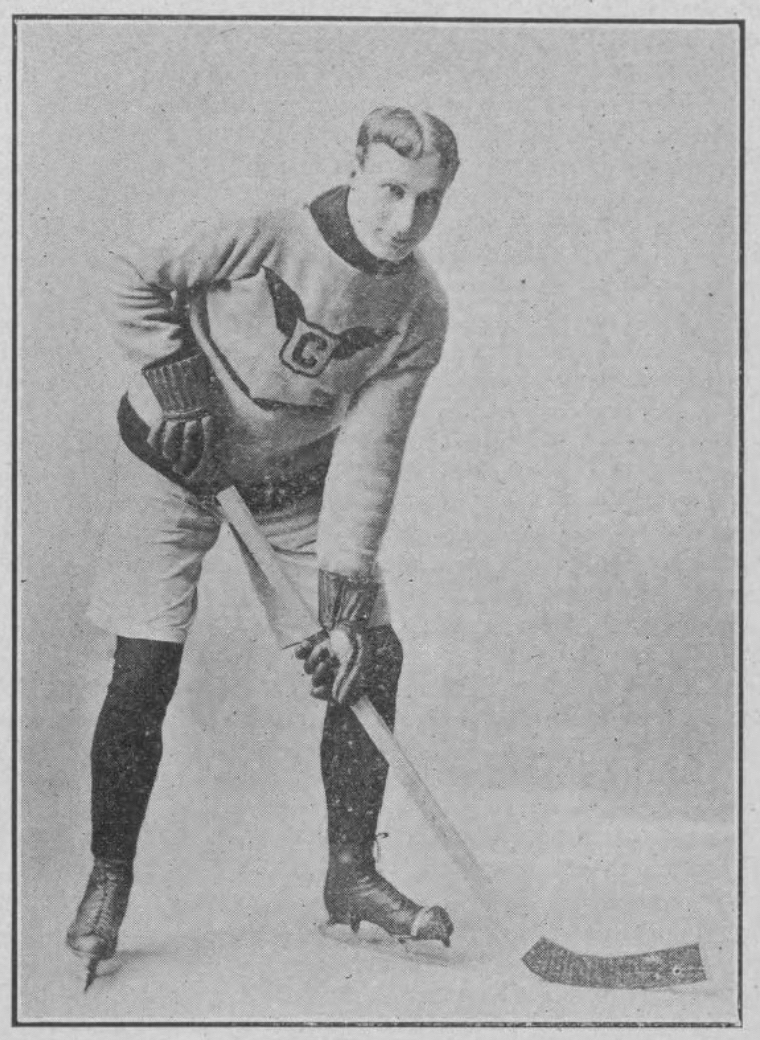
- Strike as a member of the Calumet Miners in 1905–06
- Born: December 9, 1880; Montreal, Quebec, Canada
- Died: January 30, 1967 (aged 86)
- Height: 5 ft 7 in (170 cm)
- Weight: 140 lb (64 kg; 10 st 0 lb)
- Position: Centre
- Shot: Left
- Played for: Montreal Wanderers; Calumet Miners; Montreal Montagnards; Toronto Tecumsehs
- Playing career: 1899–1914

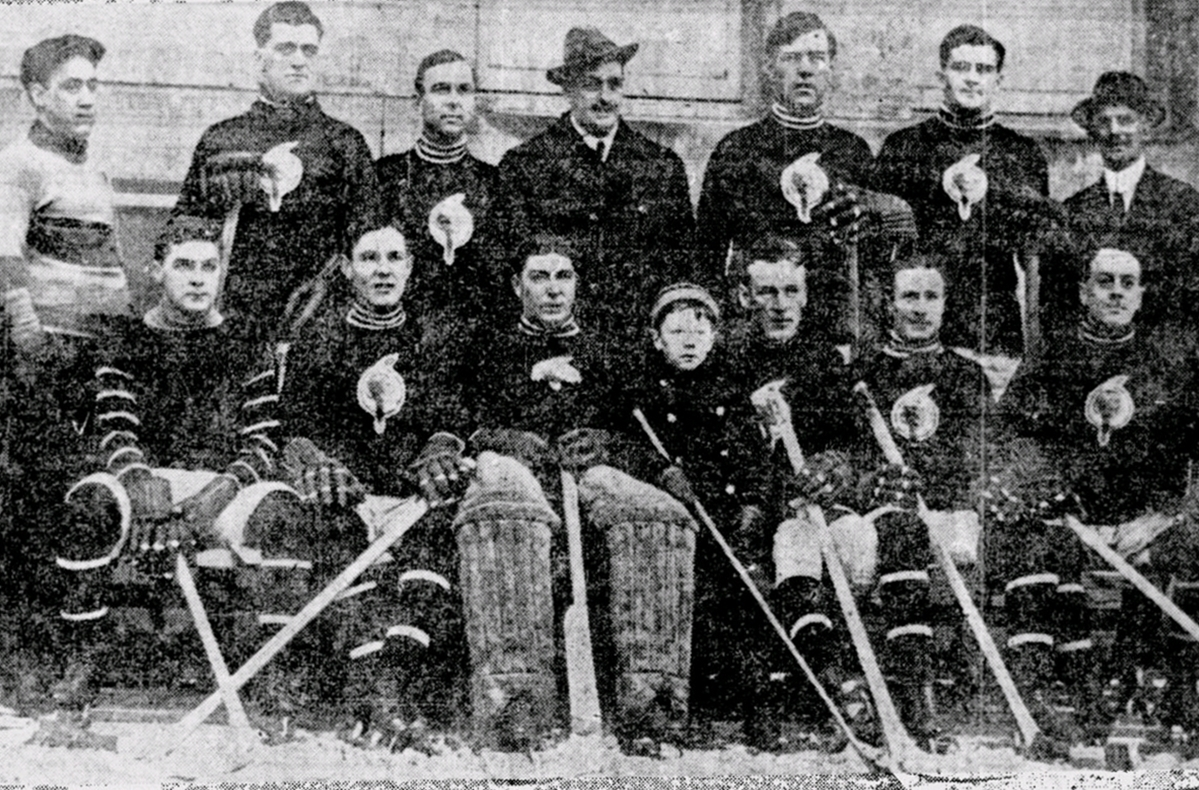
Fred Strike, second from right in the front row, with the 1912–13 Toronto Tecumsehs.

Frederick Ernest Strike (December 9, 1880 – January 30, 1967) was a Canadian amateur and professional ice hockey player from Montreal. He played with the Toronto Tecumsehs of the National Hockey Association in the 1912–13 season. Before his time in the NHA Strike played with the Calumet Miners in the IPHL for two seasons in 1904–1906. In the 1904–05 inaugural IPHL season he led the league with 44 goals as Calumet won the league title.

== Career ==
Prior, in-between, and after his pro stints in Calumet and Toronto, Strike spent most of his hockey career with various amateur teams in his hometown of Montreal, captaining the intermediate Montreal Hockey Club in 1902–03. He also played briefly for Picton in the Ontario Hockey Association in 1903–04, although his season there was initially disrupted by a severe cold and subsequent treatment for pneumonia.

During the 1903–04 FAHL season, Strike also played for the Montreal Wanderers, where he was a teammate of future fellow Calumet players Billy Nicholson and Jimmy Gardner.
