= Ernie Liffiton =

Canadian ice hockey player

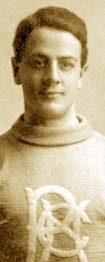
- Ernie Liffiton during the 1906-07 season with the Pittsburgh Professionals.
- Born: January 25, 1885 Montreal, Quebec, Canada
- Died: January 23, 1949 (aged 63) Windsor, Ontario, Canada
- Height: 5 ft 7 in (170 cm)
- Weight: 170 lb (77 kg; 12 st 2 lb)
- Position: Left Wing
- Shot: Left
- Played for: WPHL; Pittsburgh Bankers; IPHL; Pittsburgh Professionals; ECAHA; Montreal Wanderers; NHA; Renfrew Creamery Kings; Toronto Tecumsehs; MPHL; Halifax Crescents
- Playing career: 1905–1913

Ernest James Liffiton (January 25, 1885 – January 23, 1949) an early professional ice hockey player. Over the span of his career he played for Pittsburgh Bankers, Pittsburgh Professionals, Renfrew Creamery Kings, Montreal Wanderers, Halifax Crescents and the Toronto Tecumsehs. In 1908, he played on the Montreal Wanderers team that won the Stanley Cup.

== Renfew vs. Pembroke ==
In December 1907, the Pembroke Hockey Club refused to play against the Renfrew Creamery Kings. They objected to the presence of Ernie, who was a member of Montreal Wanderers at the time, and was slated to play for the team. In that match and one that followed, both teams brought in professional players from Montreal and Ottawa to bolster their chances for victory.

== Personal life ==
Ernie was the son of a jeweler and grew up in a family of one sister and five brothers. In 1909, at the age of twenty-four, Ernie married Louise Jane Thomas. He worked in his fathers Montreal wholesale jewelry and confection store, but in later years moved to Windsor, Ontario where he worked in the steel industry. He and his second wife, Hedwig "Hattie" Rueckwald, would go on to raise four children.

Although Ernie played hockey professionally, the census records of 1911 identify his job as "clerk".

His older brother Charlie Liffiton was also a professional hockey player.
