= Reddy McMillan =

Canadian ice hockey player

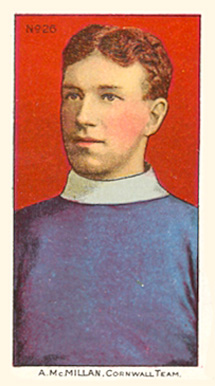
- Born: June 20, 1881; Cornwall, Ontario, Canada
- Died: June 18, 1960 (aged 78)
- Position: Left wing
- Played for: Cobalt Silver Kings; Pittsburgh Professionals; Calumet Miners
- Playing career: 1900–1910

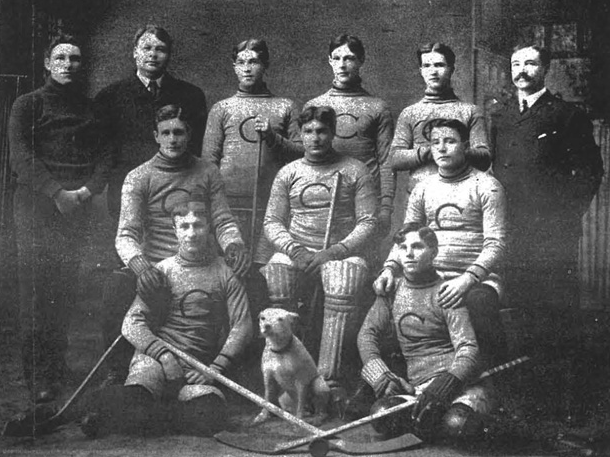
Reddy McMillan, third from left in the top row, with the Calumet-Laurium Miners in the 1904–05 IPHL season.

Aeneas Evan "Red, Reddy" McMillan (June 20, 1881 – June 18, 1960) was a professional ice hockey and lacrosse player from Cornwall, Ontario. He played with the Cobalt Silver Kings of the National Hockey Association during the league's inaugural 1910 season. He also played hockey in his hometown with the Cornwall Seniors of the Ontario Hockey Association, and in the IHL with Pittsburgh and Calumet. He is a member of the Cornwall Sports Hall of Fame.

He died on June 18, 1960.
