= Palestra (Michigan) =

Arena in Laurium and Marqutte, Michigan

Coordinates: 46°33′26″N 87°23′41″W

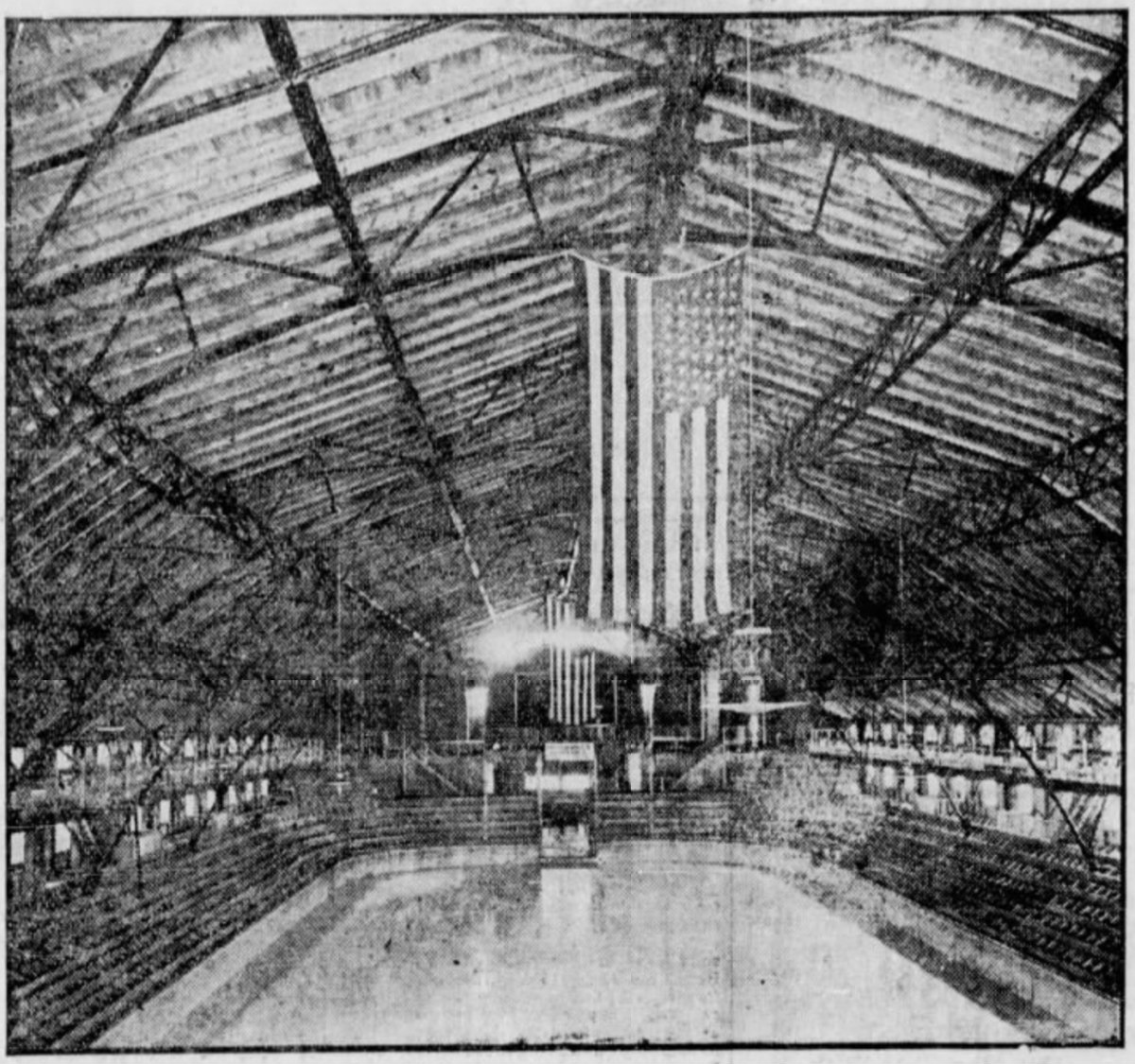
- Interior of the Palestra in 1905
- Interactive map of Palestra
- Location: Laurium, Michigan (1904–1921); Marquette, Michigan (1921–1974)
- Capacity: 4,000–5,000
- Surface: naturally frozen ice (until 1940s)
- Field size: 265 by 124 feet (arena); 180 by 78 feet (ice surface)

Construction
- Built: 1904
- Demolished: 1974
- Architect: Nels Ulseth

Tenants
- Calumet Miners (IPHL) (1904–1907); Marquette Iron Rangers (USHL) (1964–1974)

The Palestra was a 4,000- to 5,000-seat arena best known for ice hockey, even hosting a Detroit Red Wings exhibition. It also hosted boxing matches and was open for public skating.

== History ==
Built in 1904 in Laurium, Michigan, the Palestra was the first building in the world built specifically for the use of ice hockey, and for most of its existence, the Palestra had a natural ice surface. The rink was flooded and would then freeze in the cold weather. The arena did not have ice making equipment until the late 1940s. The building opened on December 16, 1904, with a professional game between Portage Lake and Calumet. Calumet won 4–3 in front of 3,000 spectators.

The building remained open through the population decline of the Copper Country in the mid- to late-1910s. The Palestra Co. purchased the building for $15,000 (equivalent to $208,000 in 2024) on September 17, 1921. The building was dismantled and reconstructed 55 days later in Marquette, Michigan, by Edward Ulseth of Calumet, Michigan, on a 300-by-400-foot (91 by 122 m) plot of land leased from Cleveland-Cliffs on the corner of 3rd and Fair streets, now the present location of the entrance to the Berry Events Center on the campus of Northern Michigan University. It reopened on December 22, 1921, with over 2,000 customers passing through the turnstiles.

In 1954, fire ripped through the Palestra and destroyed the ballroom. In 1964, the Iron Rangers hockey team received permission to heat the building with portable heaters. However, the fire marshal declared that the heaters could not be used when fans were in the building. Therefore, the building was warmed up and the heaters turned off before the doors opened for the day's game.

The building itself was 265-foot-long (81 m) by 124-foot-wide (38 m). The building was held up by a steel framework 2 by 10 inches (51 by 254 mm).

== Ice hockey teams ==
While in Laurium, the Palestra was home to the Calumet Miners of the IPHL from 1904–1907. After the move, the Palestra served as the home rink for the semi-professional Marquette Iron Rangers from 1964 until 1974. The Iron Rangers played in the United States Hockey League. Earlier, the rink was home to the Marquette Sentinels.
