= Margaret Ravoir =

American swimmer

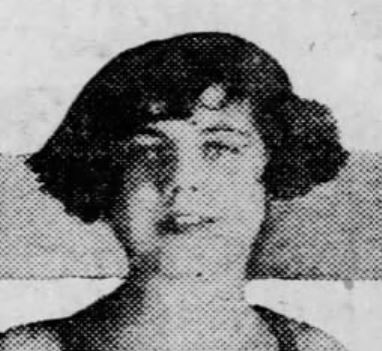
- Ravoir in 1925

Personal information
- Born: August , 1907 Philadelphia, Pennsylvania, U.S.
- Died: October 17, 1973 (aged 65–66) Philadelphia, Pennsylvania, U.S.
- Spouse: George Young (M. 1932)
- Children: George R. Young

Sport
- Sport: Swimming, Distance Swimming
- Club: Philadelphia Turgemeinde
- Coach: Johnny Walker

Margaret Ravoir (1907 - October 17, 1973) was an American swimmer who completed in the Olympics and would become best known for winning the widely attended Canadian National Exhibition women's 10-mile swim in Lake Ontario, each of the years from 1930 to 1932.

Her wins were widely covered by both Canadian and American papers, particularly in California.

== Early and personal life ==
Ravoir was born in Philadelphia in 1907, to Philadelphia police officer George Ravoir. She was described as a husky blue-eyed curly blonde with bobbed hair.

Ravoir met Canadian-born distance swimmer and winner of the 1927 Wrigley swim from Catalina to Los Angeles, George Young, while they were both training for a Canadian National Exhibition swim in Lake Ontario in 1930. The two married in Philadelphia on November 22, 1932. The marriage sparked additional publicity for the couple, and was covered by the New York Times. She remained married to George at least through 1940, and they had one son, George R. Young. He died in 1972, by which time they were divorced.

== Athletic career ==
Ravoir had several short distance wins in women's competition in her youth including winning a 100-yard freestyle event in 1922, but she also had versatility and had placed third in New Jersey's annual Riverton three mile marathon swim as only a sixteen year old in August 1922.

In another victory in January 1923, she won the 500-yard, Middle Atlantic District freestyle championship at the Ambassador Swimming Club in 7:44.

Showing all-round versatility in her swimming, she won a 300-yard medley swim of back, breast, and freestyle swimming at the National Junior 300-yard medley at the Aquatic Carnival of the Ambassador Swimming Club in 5:33 in Atlantic City on the evening of April 5, 1924.

=== Lake Ontario marathon wins ===
In 1930, in her first win of the highly publicized Lake Ontario 10-mile women's Marathon sponsored by William Wrigley, which she had trained for with her future husband George Young, her time was 5 hours, 33 minutes. Though Ravoir won the women's event that year, future husband George Young failed to place in the men's 15-mile event.

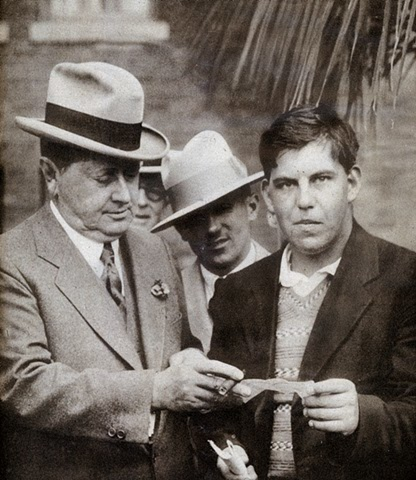
William Wrigley, left, with husband George Young, right, in 1927

On August 29, 1931, when Young won the 15-mile men's division for the Lake Ontario swim, Ravoir had an exceptional swim time, going under the 5-hour marker, completing the ten-mile women's race in 4:56:44 before a noteworthy crowd of 80,000. With the water temperature at 70 degrees, it was one of the warmest races in the series. She was around twenty-five at the time. Against 35 rivals, and a crowd of 100,000, she won the event and took home the $5,000 first prize purse, completing the race a half mile ahead of the second-place finisher.

Despite her margin of victory, diminished crowds and the Depression cut her earnings on August 27, 1932 for the 10 mile Lake Ontario Race from a former $5,000 to $3,000. She completed the race with a time of 5:22:18. She jumped into the lead only 100 yards from the start, steadily lengthening her lead as the race progressed and drew to a finnish. She won by 15 minutes and 1500 yards. Despite threatening weather, a crowd of 30,000 spectators lined the shoreline to watch the race.

On her return to her hometown of Philadelphia after her Canadian victories, she was greeted by cheering crowds and afforded a variety of city honors.

== Later life and death ==
Ravoir retired in 1967 from her job in Philadelphia as a bookkeeper at the Naval Publications and Forms Center, where she had been employed for nineteen years. She was a member of Philadelphia Chapter of U. S. Olympians, The Ladies Society of Philadelphia Turners, an athletic and fraternal organization, The Ladies Philadelphia Rifle Club, and the Tabor United Church of Christ.

She died at age 66 on October 17, 1973. She was buried at Forest Hill Cemetery.
