= Oliver Seibert =

Canadian ice hockey player (1881–1944)

- Hockey Hall of Fame, 1961
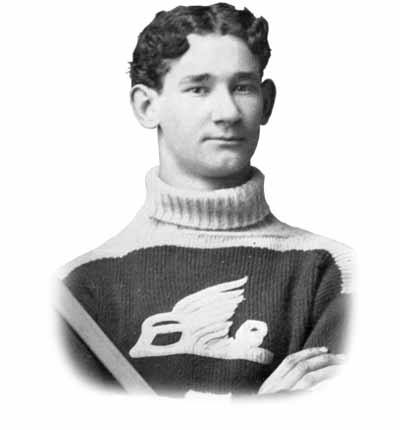
- Born: March 18, 1881 Berlin, Ontario, Canada
- Died: May 15, 1944 (aged 63) Kitchener, Ontario, Canada
- Weight: 180 lb (82 kg; 12 st 12 lb)
- Position: Centre / Goaltender
- Played for: Canadian Soo; Guelph Royals
- Playing career: 1900–1909

Oliver Levi Seibert (March 18, 1881 – May 15, 1944) was a Canadian professional ice hockey player. Seibert was one of the first players to turn professional in 1904. Seibert is the father of Earl Seibert who played professionally in the National Hockey League.

== Personal ==
Oliver Seibert was born in 1881 in Berlin, Ontario to Franklin and Sarah (née Bedford) Seibert. He was the second of fourteen children. Seibert married Emma Fuhrman on November 6, 1901. They had six children: May, Roy, Vera, Earl, Ruth and Doris. Seibert's profession on the 1911 Canadian census is listed as shop machinist. His grandfather on his father's side, Jacob E. Seibert was born in Bavaria, Germany, and his grandmother on his father's side can be traced back to Switzerland. His mother was born in England, of English parents, who emigrated to Canada. Fuhrman's parents were born in Germany.

Seibert died on May 15, 1944, of a stroke, at his home on 79 Elgin Street in Kitchener, Ontario.

== Playing career ==
The Seibert family had enough hockey players that the family organized its own team of Oliver, Edward, Nelson, Clarence, Bert, Shannon and Frank. (In that era, teams played seven men per side). Seibert was recognized for his skating skill and speed. There are conflicting accounts of Oliver, or his father, defeating a horse in a match race on the ice.

Seibert first played senior-level hockey with the Berlin Rangers in the Western Ontario Hockey Association (WOHA) in 1900. He played two years with Berlin before switching to Guelph for 1902. He returned and played one further seasons for Berlin. He was a member of Western Ontario Senior championship teams for 1900, 1901, 1902 and 1904. The Berlin team played an exhibition game in St. Louis, Missouri; it is considered one of the first games of ice hockey played on artificial ice. After the WOHA was absorbed into the Ontario Hockey Association (OHA), Seibert was declared ineligible to play in the OHA on December 30, 1904, which eliminated the possibility of play in Ontario.

On January 31, 1905, Seibert signed with the professional Canadian Soo of the International Professional Hockey League (IPHL) for $30 per week and board. He only played one game with the Soo, suffering a season-ending broken leg in his first game against Calumet on February 2, 1905. Seibert later played professional hockey for London, Ontario, and Guelph in the Ontario Professional Hockey League. The Royals played in the OPHL during the 1908–09 season. He also played professional in the Northwestern Michigan League.

Seibert was inducted into the Hockey Hall of Fame in 1961. He is also an inductee in the Waterloo Region Hall of Fame. His son Earl Seibert is also a member of the Hockey Hall of Fame and the Waterloo Region Hall of Fame.

== Career statistics ==
| | | | Regular season | | | | | Playoffs |
| Season | Team | League | GP | G | A | Pts | PIM | GP | G | A | Pts | PIM |
|---|---|---|---|---|---|---|---|---|---|---|---|---|
| 1899–1900 | Berlin Hockey Club | WOHA | 8 | 10 | 0 | 10 | — | — | — | — | — | — |
| 1900–01 | Berlin Hockey Club | WOHA | 6 | 13 | 0 | 13 | — | — | — | — | — | — |
| 1901–02 | Berlin Hockey Club | WOHA | 8 | 17 | 0 | 17 | — | — | — | — | — | — |
| 1904–05 | Canadian Soo | IPHL | 1 | 0 | 0 | 0 | 0 | — | — | — | — | — |
| WOHA totals | | | 22 | 40 | 0 | 40 | — | — | — | — | — | — |
