= George Young (swimmer) =

Scottish-Canadian swimmer

- George Young in Feb. 1927 after Wrigley Ocean Marathon Swim

Personal information
- Born: 3 March 1909 Aberdeen, Scotland
- Died: 6 August 1972 (age 63) Niagara Falls, Ontario, Canada
- Height: 5 ft 9 in, (175 cm)
- Weight: 177 lb (80 kg) (Catalina swim)
- Spouses: Margaret Ravoir (M. 1932), Glay Young

Sport
- Sport: Marathon swimming
- Club: Toronto Swimming Club '24
- Coach: Henry O'Byrne, Shier Mendelson, Johnny Walker

George Young (3 March 1909 – 6 August 1972) was a Canadian marathon swimmer who, on 15–16 January 1927, became the first person to swim the 22 mile channel between Catalina Island and the mainland of California. Though familiar to the Toronto swimming community, Young was only seventeen and a relative unknown in America, lacking the national recognition of a number of his competitors. Around three thousand spectators on Catalina Island watched the race begin. Young's 22 mile swim began with the sound of a starter's pistol on the Northeastern edge of Catalina Island at the narrow point of the Harbor at Isthmus Cove at 11:21 AM on Saturday, January 15, 1927, and ended the next morning after 15 hours 44 minutes at 3:06 AM on the rocky shores of Point Vicente Lighthouse, in Rancho Palos Verdes, South of downtown Los Angeles.

== Early swimming achievements ==
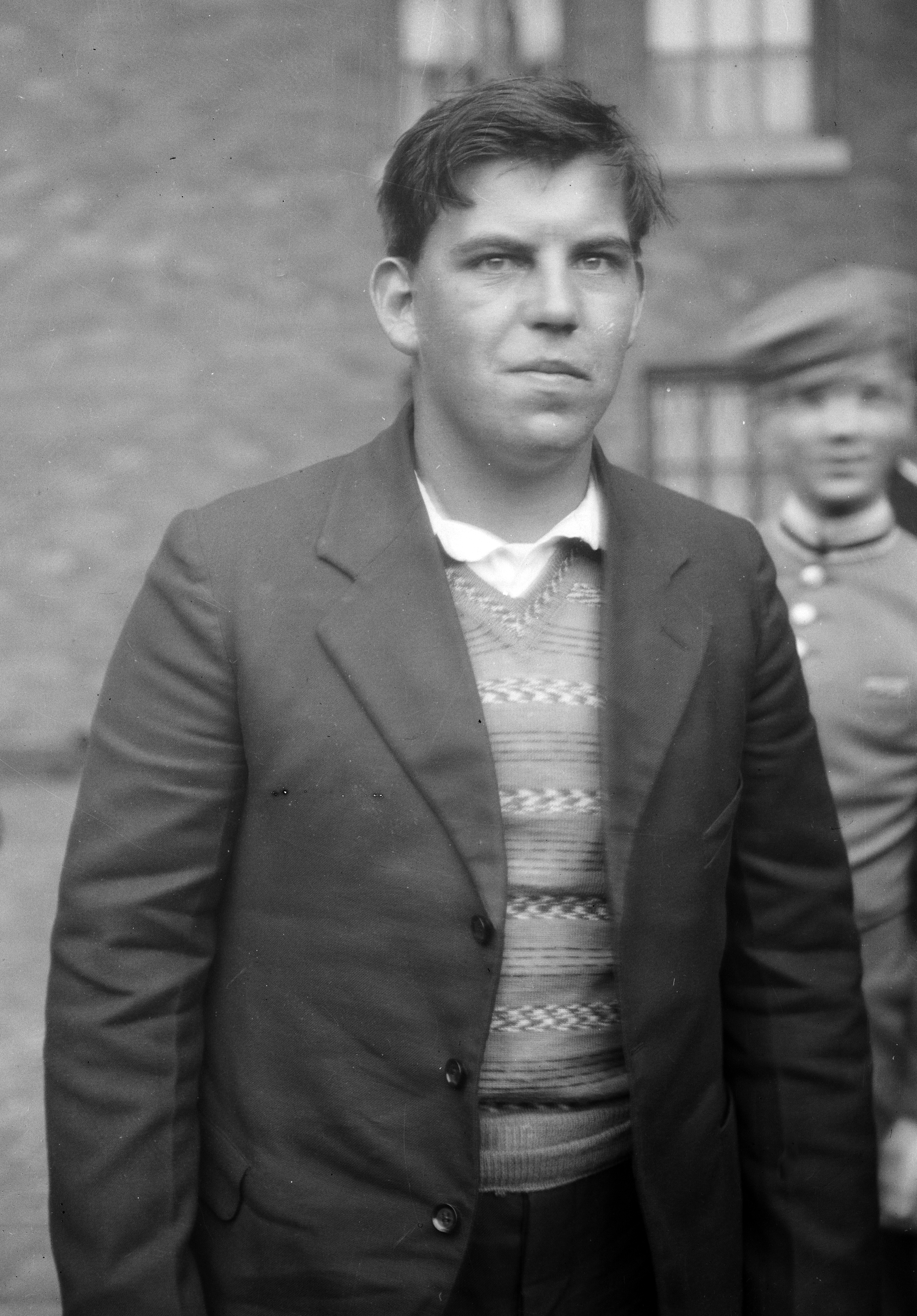
Young at Wrigley Marathon Swim

Unknown to the California crowds that thronged to meet him as he finished the race at Point Vicente, in Rancho Palos Verdes, Young was already considered a stand-out among Canadian amateur swimmers, with two victories at the Toronto Across-the-Bay Swim (1.25 miles) from 1923-4, and three at the Montreal Bridge-to-Bridge Swim. At five, he had taken up swimming at Ontario's Wawa Hotel Northeast of Muskoka, and 140 miles North of Toronto, where his mother worked summers as a domestic. Later, while swimming with the Toronto West End YMCA in his hometown, he set local records for the 200, 220, 440, and 880 yard marks. Young's Toronto coach Johnny Walker harbored the possibility of Olympic hopes for George. In 1924, Young completed an international mile swim championship in 23:41:30, matching his time in 1925.

=== Catalina swim training ===
Young later claimed in a story he wrote for Regina's Leader-Post, he had once swum fifteen miles with rests at Muskoka, Ontario's WaWa Hotel in 1922. He completed several two-mile swims while remaining in the water for 2–3 hours in the cold Pacific, while watched by his coach Henry O'Byrne off Santa Monica in December 1926, a month prior to his Catalina Channel win. He trained for a little over two weeks with O'Bryne off Santa Monica Pier prior to the race to acclimate to the current and cold water, and night swims were included in his training.

== Catalina channel swim ==
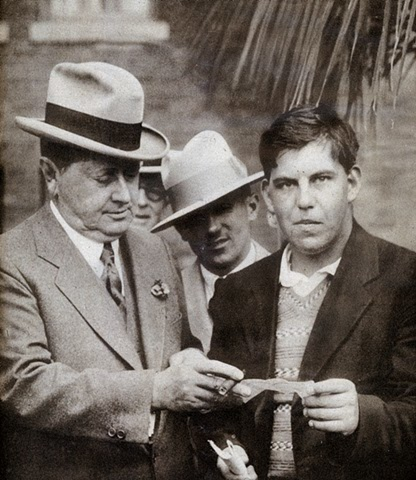
William Wrigley, left, with Young, right, 1927

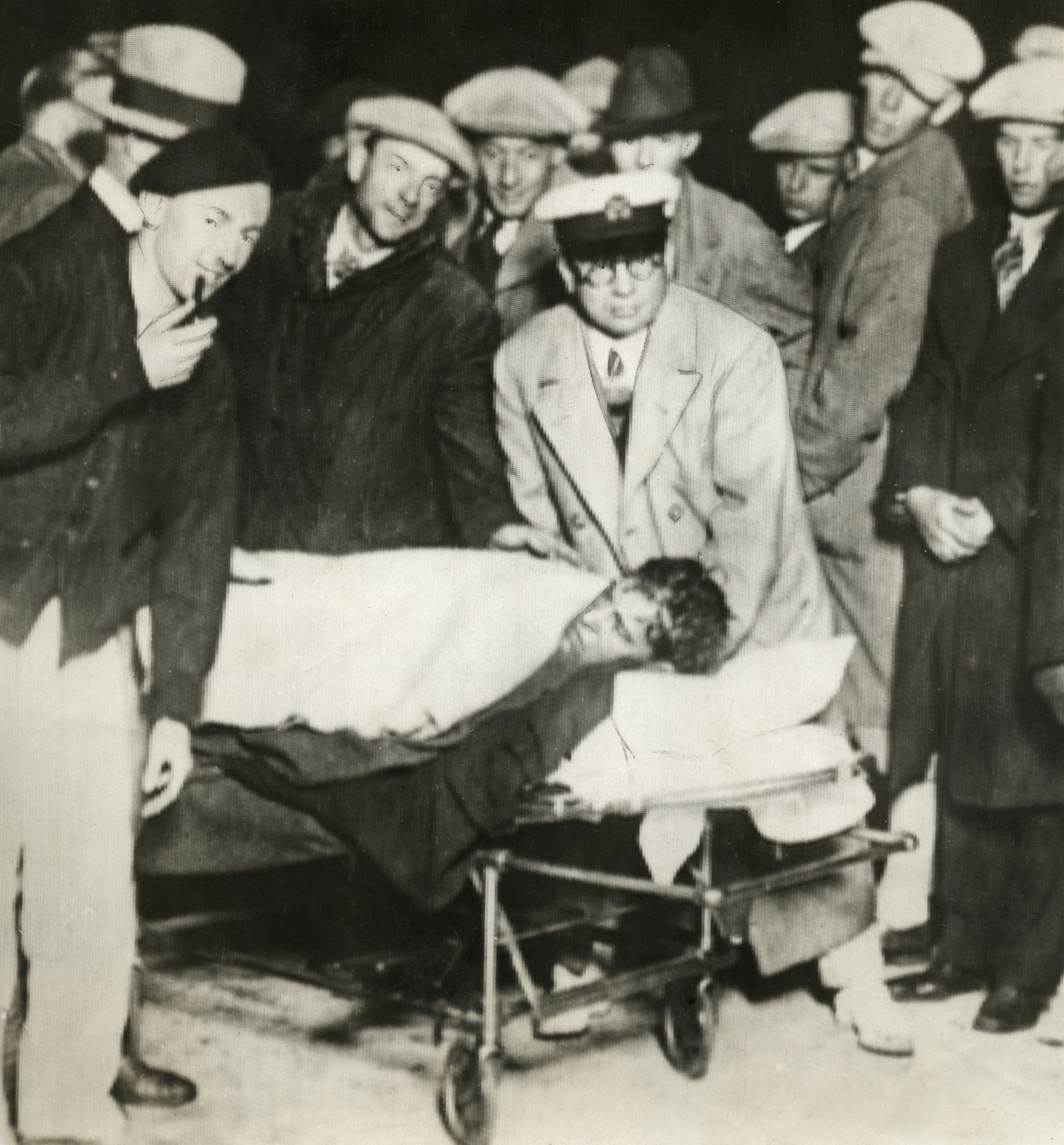
Young on stretcher after swim, Jan '27

Young's 1927 Catalina swim took place as part of the William Wrigley Ocean Marathon, sponsored by chewing gum and sports magnate William Wrigley Jr. Wrigley owned a resort on Catalina Island centered on Avalon Harbor and wanted to advertise the beauty of the destination in the warm winter off season. As Wrigley anticipated, the Press wrote a great deal about the upcoming race, focusing on race strategies of swimming with the tides, rules, and the favorites, including Olympian Norman Ross. Young was the only person to complete the 35-kilometre (22 mi) swim, which took him 15 hours and 44 minutes, in a field of around 102 swimmers, many well-known, with two having completed the English channel, Americans Henry Sullivan and Charles Toth.

Classified as a cold-water swim, the Catalina channel was only 54 F (13 C), at the start, with a fog and whitecaps, and though the average air temperature was in the low 60's, there was a cool evening breeze later that night. Within a few years, the race would be held closer to the summer when water temperatures in the mid to high 60's were common. Though he wore no wet suit, Young had graphite and a coating of grease originally close to a quarter inch think, under his bathing suit, as did many other competitors, though he wore no goggles by his own account. Rules forbid rubber suits, but allowed no suits at all if enough grease was applied. At least one female competitor, Charlotte Schoemmell, a New York swim champion, with the eventual rules committee's approval, vowed to wear several pounds of thick grease and nothing else to prevent the chafing from the uncomfortable swim suits common in 1927. The rules required each swimmer to have an escort boat clearly displaying the swimmer's number, and each escort boat had to be equipped with several days of food, water, gasoline and a first aid kit. Young was fed hot chocolate and chicken broth as needed, as suggested by race consultant Gertrude Ederle who had recently become the first woman to swim the English channel. All contestants had to remain in the water during feedings, however, and could have no support of any kind. Wrigley kept a few hospital boats stationed within reach in case of an emergency.

By 5:00 P.M., only thirty swimmers remained in the water of the original 102 starters, and eventually all of Young's competitors were pulled from the water exhausted before completing their swim, though a very few came very close to the California shore. At his Catalina marathon win, Young met fellow competitor Toronto native Shier Mendelson, a veteran open water swimmer who had won the Toronto Across the Bay 1.5-mile competition four times. Mendelson did not finish, but he trained some with George off the Santa Monica Pier and would later become one of Young’s managers and mentors and coach college swimmers as well.

=== Swam with tides ===
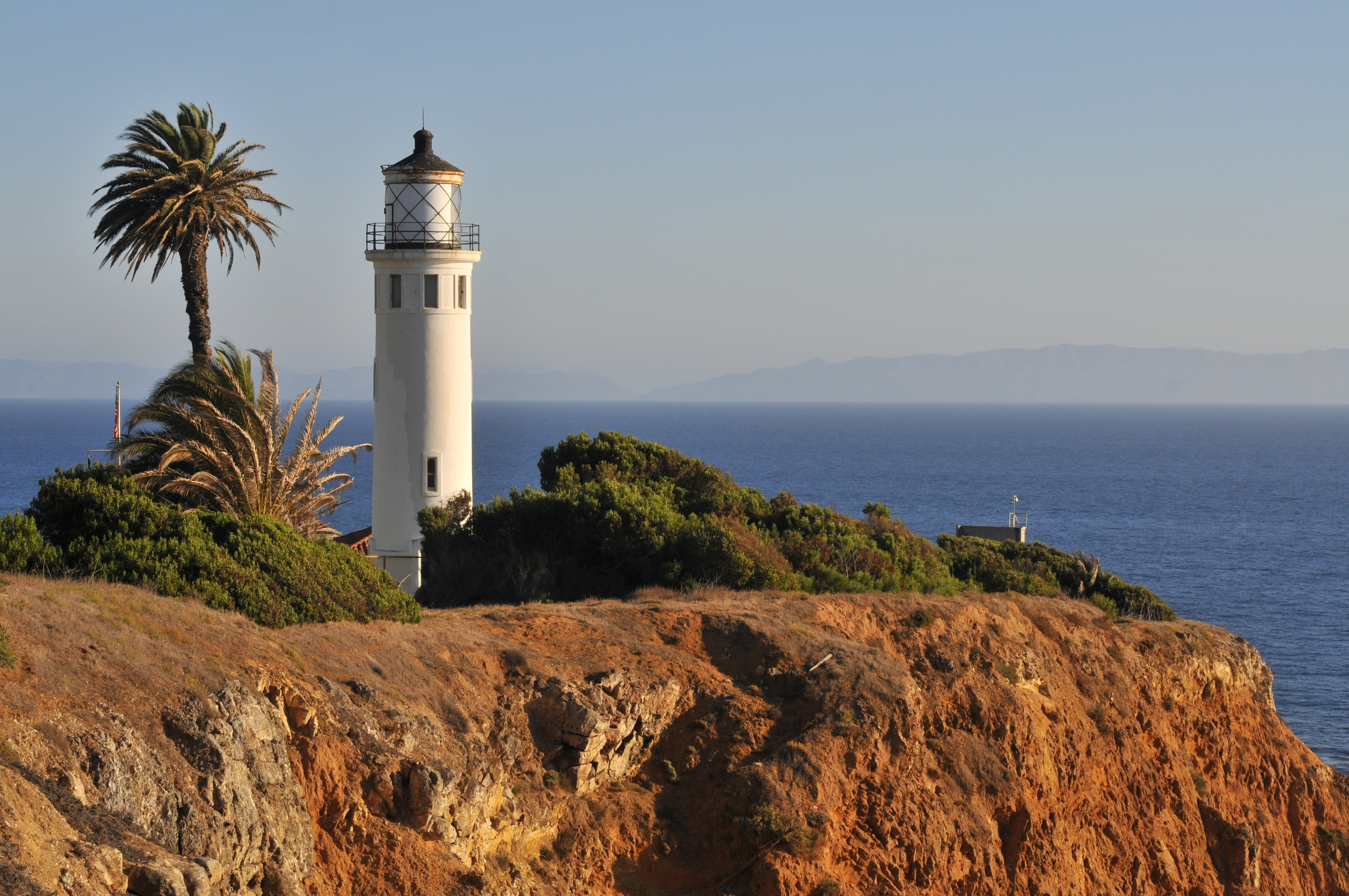
Rocky coast of Point Vicente Light House

Young began his race swimming Northeast from the Santa Catalina's Isthmus Cove until a prevailing tide caught him and pushed him towards the finish at Point Vicente Lighthouse, in Palos Verdes, just South of Los Angeles on the California shore. According to his own account, he changed course during the swim to meet the opposition of the tides and to swim with the prevailing current at his back. Young also recounted that seven miles from Catalina he swam through a heavy 200 yard oil slick where he was required to keep his head and eyes out of the water. An offshore current went against his final few miles once he approached the California shore, requiring patience, rest, and additional effort, and he became entangled at times in beds of kelp. At the finish, the recently constructed Point Vicente Lighthouse guided him in, and spectators flashed their car lights, lit bonfires, and cheered him on. George had removed his suit to prevent friction, and after reaching the shore quickly found the cover of his small escort boat.

=== Competition from Norman Ross ===
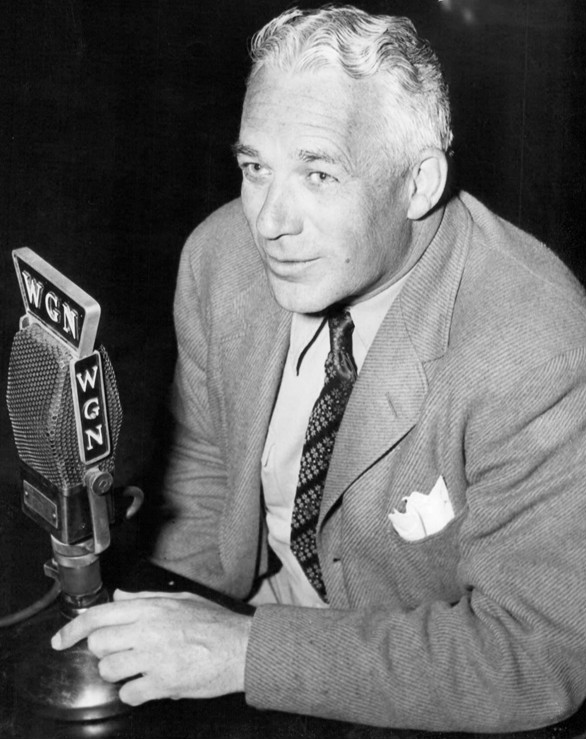
Gold medalist Norman Ross circa 1950

His winning Catalina swim earned him the name "The Catalina Kid" and a prize of $25,000, which he would see little of after paying debts and have to wait until he was 30 to collect. Only seventeen and untried in such a highly publicized competition, to the general public he was an unknown in the world of distance swimming, particularly in California. Race favorites included Charlotte Schoemmell, the third woman to swim around Manhattan Island, and Leo Purcell and Mark Wheeler, top California swimmers. Drawing public attention to the 1927 Catalina race, Young's closest competitor once the race began was 1920 triple Olympic gold medalist, American swimming star and West coast native Norman Ross who followed Young closely until near the final stretch. Ross was forced to quit the race from cramps and fatigue at 2:40 am on the early morning of January 16, with only around three miles left, having trailed Young closely at many points for the first nineteen miles. Two West coast women competitors, Margaret Hauser, and Martha Stager quit the race within two miles of shore and were to receive $2500 from Wrigley for their efforts.

=== Public acclaim, with limited financial gain ===
Young became the source of a great deal of publicity and acclaim in California and after returning to Canada after his Catalina Channel win. A crowd of 150,000 lined the streets to catch a glimpse of him in his home-town Toronto, and he was met with large crowds in subsequent tours of several Ontario cities. Press accounts noted that the City of Toronto presented George with a home in recognition of his win. Miscalculating her son's future earnings, and unknown to him, Young's mother Jane had signed an agreement with Toronto native Henry "Doc" O'Byrne, a coach and trainer, that gave O'Byrne $10,000 of Young's $25,000 Catalina Marathon winnings, a 40% stake, which was to include additional income related to the Catalina marathon. O'Byrne was in Young's escort boat during the race. Young made several well-paid appearances, staying on in California, but his earning from the swim and subsequent appearances may have been limited by his contract with and management by O'Byrne, according to a story in the Ontario Journal. A potential highly lucrative movie offer never came through, nor did a regular vaudeville stint as a result of O'Byrne's management. According to the Pasadena Post, Young did not receive his share of the Catalina Marathon winnings until 1940, as he was not to be paid until he reached 30, and the money was placed in a trust by Wrigley. As there were mounting debts in liens against his winnings, and a 40% share to Coach and Manager Henry O'Byrne, Young only received $400, of his $15,000 share in 1940, a considerably reduced sum. In an interview in January 1927, O'Byrne stated he would decline his 40% share, but it does not appear this occurred, and after debts, George still received little of his total winnings.

== Inconsistent swimming career ==
After his Catalina Channel win, his future attempts at a long distance swimming career were inconsistent, failing to complete the Lake Ontario swims each year from 1927-1930. His Lake Ontario marathons were all fifteen mile swims with the exception of the 1927 swim which was 21 miles. A single Lake Ontario win in 1931 earned Young $10,000 and a 1928 win in the 20 mile Montreal to Repentigney Marathon earned Young only $350.

=== 1927, 21-Mile Lake Ontario swim ===
He failed to finish several subsequent competitions, including a well-publicized 21-mile Canadian National Exhibition Marathon in Lake Ontario, the summer after his Catalina swim, which was won by German swimmer Ernst Vierkotter, also Vierkoetter, in August 1927, for a $30,000 prize. Young was pulled from the water after five miles. After he failed to complete several competitions, a few fickle members of the Press labeled him a quitter and public interest in Young began to wane.

=== 1928, 15-Mile Lake Ontario swim ===
In 1928, not a single swimmer of the 199 who started the 15-mile Lake Ontario marathon of the Canadian National Exhibition series on September 6 completed the swim, despite a hefty $25,000 prize being offer to the winner. As many as 100,000 spectators were said to line the shoreline at the start. Young completed around seven miles and was well-placed among the top competitors, before he was pulled from the cold water. Close competitors included Norman Ross and German swimmer Ernst Vierkoetter who fought for the lead in the early race. Georges Michel, a Frenchmen completed 12 1/2 miles before being pulled from the lake.

=== Wins Sept 1928 Montreal to Repentigney Marathon ===
In late August 1928, George won a swim in the St. Lawrence, beginning at the Montreal's Victoria Pier, known as the Montreal to Repentigney Marathon. Twenty-four swimmers competed. According to the Windsor Star, Young completed a lengthy distance, stated as 20 miles, in 3 hours 58 minutes, which seems far too fast a time, but he was pushed by the St. Lawrence's strong Northeasterly current at his back. At the time of the race, Young was still backed and sponsored by sports manager Teddy Oke. George took home the LaPress Trophy, a $250 cash prize, and two lap prizes of $50, bringing his earnings to $350. Edgar Findlay of Montreal finished second. That summer, Young was involved in a controversy between two women he was dating who both claimed he had proposed marriage; swimmer Jewel Cheatwood, a 19-year old Terre Haute School Teacher who had trained with George's swim coach Johnny Walker and to whom he had given a ring, and Lorraine Moolenaar.

=== 1929, 15-mile Lake Ontario swim ===
George was forced to withdraw due to cramping from a 15-mile Lake Ontario Marathon Swim, part of the Canadian National Exhibition sponsored by William Wrigley in August 1929 after completing around six miles, and remaining in the water about 2 hours 50 minutes. The race had a hefty $35,000 first prize. Norman Ross was near the lead at the time. Stockbroker and sports manager Teddy Oke was Young's sponsor and was disappointed as it was the third major race from which Young had withdrawn. Oke had reportedly lost a $10,000 bet on Young. In a field of 237, Edward Keating won the race in 8:18:13 followed by Earnst Vierkoetter, and Norman Ross.

=== 1930, 15-mile Lake Ontario swim ===
Out of 173 starters, nineteen year-old Marvin Nelson of Fort Dodge, Iowa won the August 1930, 15-Mile Lake Ontario Marathon Swim in record time taking the $10,000 prize, though in the previous year's race, he had suffered and been pulled from the water only half conscious. George Young was pulled from the water, which was warmer than the prior year, after about six miles.

=== Wins 1931 Lake Ontario win ===
In what was likely his last lucrative victory, at 22, Young won a 15-mile buoy-marked $10,000 Canadian National Exhibition distance swim in Lake Ontario held on September 2, 1931 in 8 hours, 8 minutes and 36 seconds, marking his second major victory, as a professional long distance competitor. The amount would very roughly equal $183,827 Canadian in 2023, or $141,000 US Dollars. Only 3 of 182 entries finished the race in the cold water lake.

=== Late swim career ===
Young continued to attempt swims as late as the mid-1930's. Around July 22, 1934, Young failed to complete a 15-Mile swim in Lake Michigan, swimming around five miles before suffering from cramps. He was scheduled to swim a lucrative $2,750 five mile match race against former rival Marvin Nelson of Iowa in Lake Ontario on September 6, 1935, but Nelson won the match with a time of 2:32:45, by only 12 yards, indicating Young was still fit and trained at the time. Young swam a subsequent nine mile race against Marvin Nelson in 1935 for $500 in Lake Nipissing in North Bay Ontario, near Muskoka, Ontario. North Bay Mayor W. G. Bullbrook started the race, but when darkness cut it short due to a large and demanding crowd delaying the start time, Nelson was declared the winner as he was ahead at the time.

== Swim retirement and marriage ==
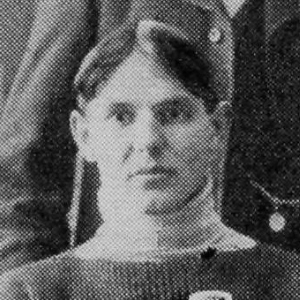
Sponsor and brief employer Teddy Oke

He retired from competitive swimming likely sometime in the mid to late 1930's, but the depression put a damper on his search for employment. In the 1930's George worked in Vaudeville while audiences paid to see him swim in a glass tank. Around the late 20's and early 30's George worked as an office boy for wealthy Sports manager, and stockbroker Teddy Oke who had played and coached Canadian hockey and sponsored minor league sports teams. Oke also helped found the Canadian Professional Hockey League and was a founder of his own stock brokerage firm F.G. Oke and Company. Oke had financially backed and managed Young when he was training in 1929 for the Wrigley Marathon Swim, part of the Canadian National Exhibition.

=== Marriages ===
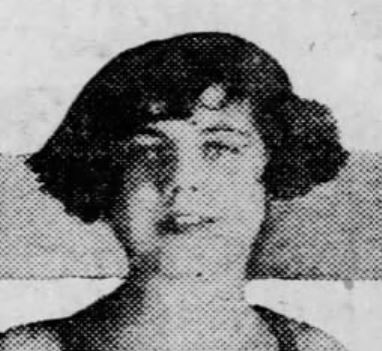
Distance swimmer, wife Margaret Ravoir, 1925

Young met Margaret Ravoir of Philadelphia, an early 1930's romantic interest of George's and accomplished swimmer herself, while training for a Canadian National Exhibition in 1930. She won the Canadian National Exhibition women's 10-mile swim in Lake Ontario each of the years from 1930-2, sharing the honor with George in 1931, when Young won the 15-mile men's division swim.

Ravoir and Young married in Philadelphia on November 22, 1932, with Ravoir about three years older than Young. The marriage sparked additional publicity for George, and was covered by the New York Times. She remained married to George at least through 1940, and they had one son, George R. Young.

Young later married his second wife, Glay, who died in July 1953 in Philadelphia, but was buried at Niagara Falls, Ontario. Several sources noted he relocated to Canada around 1953, after her death.

== Late professional life ==
George and Margaret returned to Toronto after marrying in 1932, but eventually George relocated to Margaret's hometown of Philadelphia and found work. He was employed briefly as an Electrician's helper in Philadelphia, but found longer term work as a mechanic on the Pennsylvania Railroad in Philadelphia until around 1953 and the death of his second wife Glay. According to one source he worked for a period at a logging camp in Northern Ontario after moving back to Canada, but few sources accurately detail his professional life after 1935. By 1963, a reliable source noted that he had worked for a while during the summer as a handyman at an Ontario Summer camp in Baysville, North of Toronto. He later found work at the Parks Commission in Niagara Falls, Ontario, as a Forest Ranger until his own death in August 1972. Prior to his death he collapsed on the way to a phone booth after trying to push a stalled Parks Commission truck he had been driving.

== Honors ==
In early recognition, Young was voted as an Associate for Life in the International Professional Swimmers Association founded in New York City in 1927.

Despite dwindling fame and a life of relative obscurity after the mid-1930's, the Canadian Press's fascination with Young's 1927 achievement endured. In 1950, he was named Canadian swimmer of the half century in a poll conducted by the Canadian Press. Still widely recognized by the swimming community, in 1953 he became the first swimmer to be inducted into Canada’s Sports Hall of Fame and became a member of the more broadly recognized International Swimming Hall of Fame in 2014. After his retirement from swimming, he attended the rare honorary swimming or sports banquet, but was rarely in the public eye. In 1963, in a slightly different honor by the International Swimming Hall of Fame, he was honored as an inductee into the International Marathon Swimming Hall of Fame.

== See also ==
- List of members of the International Swimming Hall of Fame
