= Teddy Oke =

Canadian ice hockey player, referee, and team owner

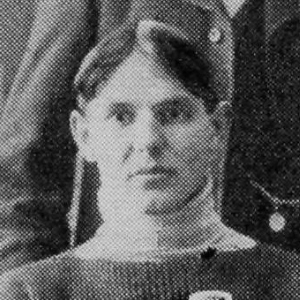
- Ted Oke with the Uxbridge, Ontario club.
- Born: September 20, 1885 Uxbridge, Ontario, Canada
- Died: April 30, 1937 (aged 51) Toronto, Ontario, Canada
- Height: 5 ft 9 in (175 cm)
- Weight: 160 lb (73 kg; 11 st 6 lb)
- Position: Left wing
- Shot: Left
- Played for: Toronto Tecumsehs; Halifax Crescents
- Playing career: 1902–1915

Frederick Gilmore "Teddy" Oke (September 20, 1885 – April 30, 1937) was a Canadian professional ice hockey player, referee, team owner, sponsor, miner, and highly successful stock broker who started F.G. Oke and Company in 1922. Oke played for the Toronto Tecumsehs and Toronto Blueshirts of the National Hockey Association (NHA) and the Halifax Crescents of the Maritime Professional Hockey League (MPHL). He was the owner of the minor-league Kitchener Flying Dutchmen of the Canadian Professional Hockey League.

== Hockey career ==
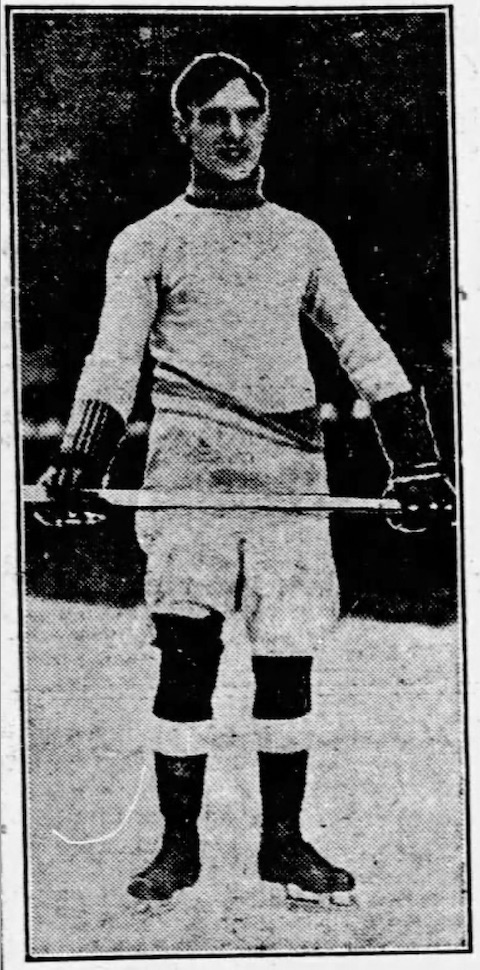
Oke circa 1912

Born in Uxbridge, Ontario, Teddy Oke played junior ice hockey with the Uxbridge Ontario Hockey Association (OHA) team from 1902 until 1904. In his youth, he went North and was a star with a Northern Ontario baseball team, while also playing lacrosse and Hockey. In the summers he divided his time between prospecting and baseball. He played one further season of junior around 1905 with the Sault Ste. Marie Tagonas of the Northern Ontario League.

Oke became a professional with the Haileybury Hockey Club in the Timiskaming Professional Hockey League in 1906. He played in three seasons with Haileybury. In 1912, Oke signed with the new Toronto Tecumsehs, playing one season with the club. In 1913–14, he played with Halifax, and in 1914–15, he played with the Toronto Blueshirts.

He was a WWI veteran. In 1915, around the age of 30, he received a commission as a lieutenant with the 180th (Sportsman Battalion) and sailed for France where he stayed until 1917. His wartime experience affected his health to where he decided to end his career as a professional athlete.

== Stockbroker ==
Oke made a large mining strike in the Cobalt district, and for a time was a member of the Toronto mining exchange through 1933, though he rejoined around 1936. Shortly after his WWI service, he joined a Toronto Brokerage Firm in 1918, and in 1922 formed his own company. By 1927, his own F.G. Oke and Company had offices in seven Ontario cities, and Oke had become wealthy. He was also President of Acorn Securities Limited.

== Sports management career ==
Utilizing his wealth from his stock brokerage career, Oke was one of the founders of the Canadian Professional Hockey League (CPHL) in 1926, in which he owned the Kitchener Millionaires. Oke purchased the Toronto team in the Can-Pro league in 1928 and moved the Millionaires players to Toronto for one year, splitting the players with a new team in Kitchener, the Kitchener Flying Dutchmen. In 1929, the International Hockey League was formed and the team was renamed the Toronto Falcons. It played one season before disbanding. The team was later moved to Cleveland, Ohio. Oke would do double duty that season, replacing the coach, Hughie Lehman. That season the CPHL was continued as a supplier league to the IHL, and Kitchener continued for one season in that league.

He backed Canadian distance swimmer George Young when he was training in 1929 for the 15-mile Wrigley Marathon Swim, part of the Canadian National Exhibition, but was disappointed when Young lost. At 17, in a highly publicized event, Young had won the 22 mile Wrigley Marathon Swim from Santa Catalina to Palos Verdes on the California Coast in 1927. He also sponsored 1928 Canadian Olympic Medalist high jumper Ethel Catherwood.

He was noted for forming the Parkdale Ladies Athletic Club which had 300 members in 1930, the year he helped to build a new Club House. The Club included many Canadian women Olympians including swimmers, divers, runners, jumpers, and other disciplines. He also helped with a Boys Athletic Club, which sponsored young male athletes. Many athletes considered him the angel of sport, and it was said of him that "No athlete who has applied to Mr. Oke for assistance in preparing himself for a contest has been turned down if he is earnest, and will seriously train.

He died at his home in Toronto on April 30, 1937. Though ordered by his physician to take a complete rest from business activities a month before his death, he had continued to direct his businesses from his bed. He was said to have more sports connections than any other man in Canada. He was survived by a wife and a daughter.

The F. G. "Teddy" Oke Trophy of the American Hockey League (AHL) is named after Oke, who presented it in 1927 to the CPHL champion London Panthers.
