= Jack Gibson (ice hockey, born 1880) =

- Hockey Hall of Fame, 1976 (Builder)
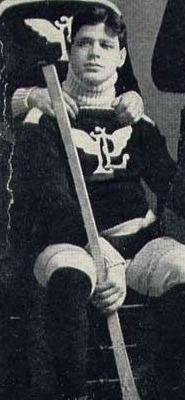
- Gibson with Portages Lakes, circa 1902–03
- Born: September 10, 1880 Berlin, Ontario, Canada
- Died: November 4, 1954 (aged 74) Calgary, Alberta
- Height: 6 ft 0 in (183 cm)
- Weight: 185 lb (84 kg; 13 st 3 lb)
- Position: Defence
- Played for: Berlin Hockey Club; Portage Lakes Hockey Club
- Playing career: c. 1895–1907

John Liddell MacDonald Gibson (September 10, 1880 – November 4, 1954) was a Canadian-born ice hockey player and executive. Known as the "father of professional hockey", Gibson founded the International Professional Hockey League in 1904, the first fully professional hockey league in history. He was elected to the Hockey Hall of Fame as a builder in 1976.

== Biography ==
Jack Gibson was born in Berlin, Ontario, which later became Kitchener. As a youth, he excelled in academics and athletics, playing a number of sports well, including lacrosse, cricket, rowing, running, cycling, tennis, and skating. Gibson received an offer to play in the developmental system of Everton Football Club. He considered the move, but decided to stay in North America to continue his studies. He graduated from Berlin High School in 1896.

Gibson was a gifted hockey player who played throughout Ontario and helped the Berlin Hockey Club win the provincial intermediate championship team in 1897. Gibson and his teammates were expelled from the Ontario Hockey Association (OHA) in 1898 after being accused of accepting payment. The OHA was militantly opposed to professionalism and banned the team after Berlin's mayor presented each player with a $10 gold coin in celebration of a win over the rival team from Waterloo. Gibson had offered to return the coin, to no avail.

He attended Pickering College to pursue a Bachelor of Science. He was also a member of the Pickering football team. Later, he moved to the University of Detroit Dental School.

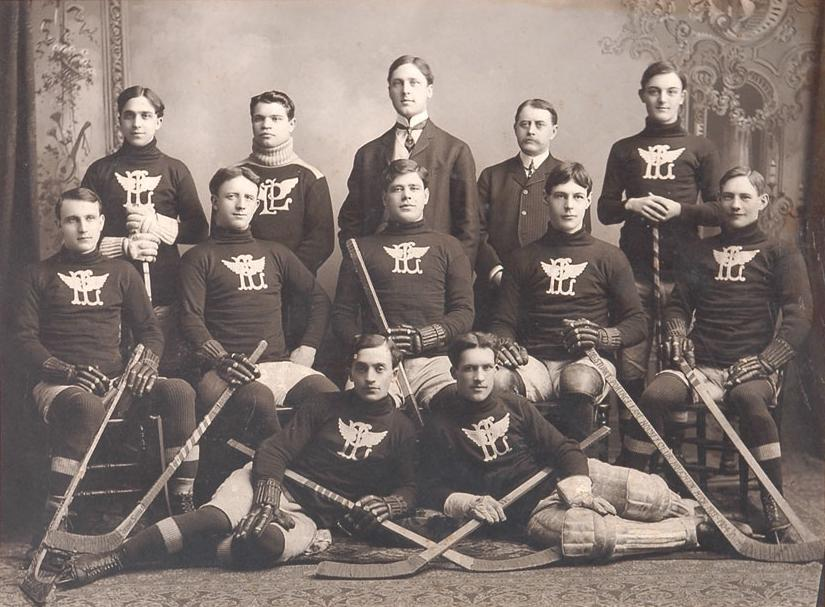
Gibson, at center, with the Portage Lakes HC.

After graduation, he moved to the northern Michigan community of Houghton to set up a dental practice. Still a gifted hockey player, he recruited other talented individuals and established the Portage Lakes Hockey Club in 1900–01. Portage Lakes was an openly professional team, and Gibson captained the squad and was its leading scorer.

After defeating the Montreal Wanderers in 2 exhibition contests in the 1903–04 season in front of 5,000 fans at the Houghton Amphidrome, it became obvious to Gibson that Northern Michigan was a hockey hotbed and could sustain a league and the International Professional Hockey League, the first professional hockey league in the world, opened for business in 1904.

Gibson retired from playing after 1904, but remained active in recruiting players to the league, while also serving as a referee. Gibson attracted the likes of Hod and Bruce Stuart, Riley Hern, and Cyclone Taylor to play in the league. In addition to Houghton Portage Lakes, the Calumet Miners, Michigan Soo Indians, the Pittsburgh Pro Hockey Club and the Canadian Soo team rounded out the league. The league folded after only three years when professional hockey became a reality in Canada in 1907 and many of the star players returned home. 15 of the 97 players who played in the IPHL from 1904 to 1907, including Gibson, are members of the Hockey Hall of Fame.

After practising dentistry and refereeing local games in Houghton for a few years, Gibson also returned to Canada and set up a dental practice in Calgary, Alberta, where he resided until he died in 1954. In 1976 Gibson was inducted into the Hockey Hall of Fame as a builder.

Beginning in 1939, a trophy, named the Gibson Cup, was awarded to the champion of the Michigan-Ontario Pro Hockey League. Today, the Gibson Cup is given to the winner of an annual challenge series between the Portage Lake Pioneers and the Calumet Wolverines. The Gibson Cup is the third-oldest hockey cup in North America, behind only the Stanley Cup (1893) and the MacNaughton Cup (1913). The MacNaughton Cup goes to the regular-season champion of the Western Collegiate Hockey Association. He joined the United States Hockey Hall of Fame during 1973.

== Bibliography ==
- Brown, H.W., B.A. (1927), "The Kitchener and Waterloo Collegiate and Vocational School: Its History", Fifteenth Annual Report of the Waterloo Historical Society, 15: 268–284
- Fitsell, J.W (1987), Hockey's Captains, Colonels & Kings, Erin, Ontario: The Boston Mills Press, ISBN 0-919-783-68-6
- Harper, Stephen J. (2013), A Great Game: The Forgotten Leafs and the Rise of Professional Hockey, Simon & Schuster Canada, ISBN 978-1-4767-1653-4
- Biographical record: this volume contains biographical sketches of leading citizens of Houghton, Baraga and Marquette Counties, Michigan ... Atlantic states series of biographical review, vol. XIV. Biographical Publishing Company. 1903. pp. 343–345. hdl:2027/miun.arh7481.0001.001.
