= Toronto Tecumsehs =

- City: Toronto, Ontario
- League: National Hockey Association
- Founded: 1911
- Operated: 1912–1913
- Home arena: Arena Gardens
- Colours: Red and White
- Owner: W. J. Bellingham
- General manager: Billy Nicholson
- Head coach: Billy Nicholson

The Tecumseh Hockey Club, also known as the Toronto Tecumsehs and nicknamed the Indians, were a team in the National Hockey Association in 1912–13. They then became the Toronto Ontarios.

== History ==
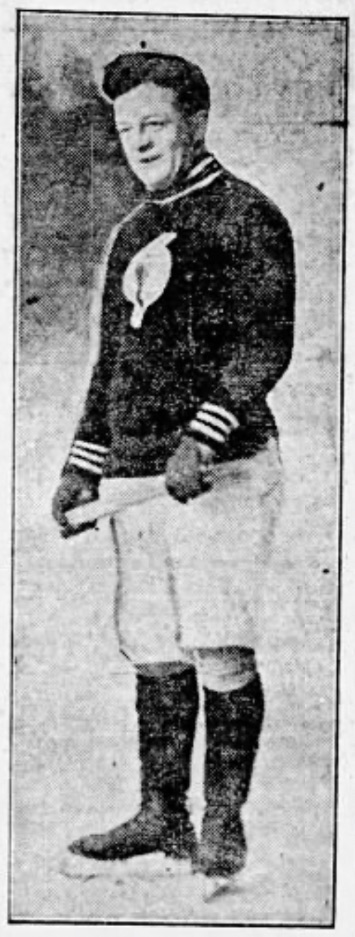
Ernie Liffiton with the Tecumsehs.

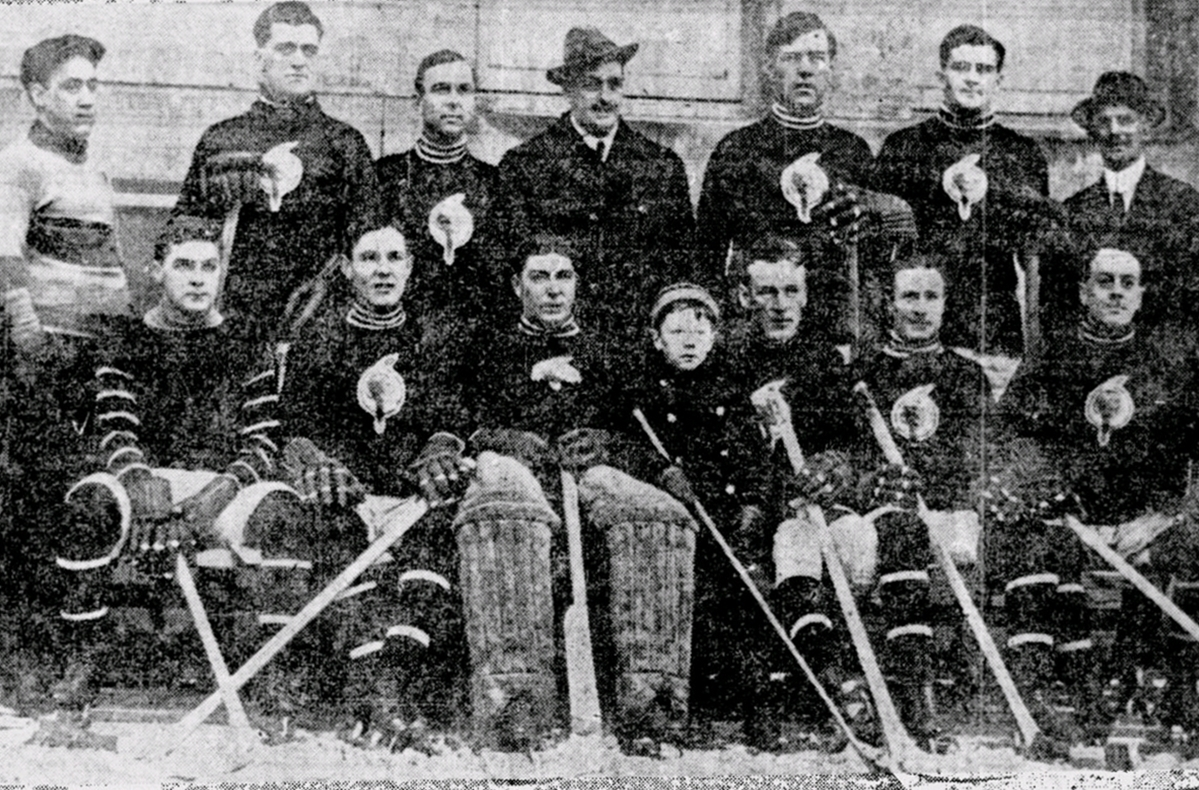
First team picture of the Tecumsehs team. Standing (left to right): Tom Daly (trainer), George McNamara, Horace Gaul, Cap Williams, Con Corbeau, Howard McNamara, Billie Pop. Sitting: Alex Nicholson, Teddy Oke, Billy Nicholson (manager), the mascot, Art Throop, Fred Strike, Ernie Liffiton.

The NHA was founded in 1909 without any teams from Toronto, Ontario because there was not an arena in the city that was large enough to sustain a franchise. In 1911, a new arena was being built in Toronto and a franchise was awarded to the Toronto Hockey Club, and a group affiliated with the Tecumseh Lacrosse Club applied for a second franchise. The Tecumsehs bought a franchise from Ambrose O'Brien, paying CA$500 cash and promissory notes for CA$2,000.

The Tecumsehs were put on the NHA schedule for the 1911–12 season with no home games scheduled until late in January, when the arena was expected to be completed. Because of construction delays, it soon became clear that the arena would not be ready in time, and both Toronto teams were removed from the schedule, leaving the NHA with only four teams for the season.

Before the 1912–13 season started, O'Brien said that he never received the balance of the franchise fee from the Tecumseh backers, so he re-sold the franchise to a group headed by William James "Billy" Bellingham from Montreal, a former defenceman of the Montreal Victorias. Goaltender Billy Nicholson, formerly with Montreal Hockey Club, was appointed player-manager-captain. The team he put together included future hall-of-famer George McNamara and his brother, Howard McNamara. Teddy Oke, who would go on to be one of the founders of the Canadian Professional Hockey League in 1926, was also on the team.

They played their first game on December 28, 1912 against the Montreal Wanderers at the arena, which would soon become known as Arena Gardens. The visiting Wanderers won 7-4 in front of 5,000 fans. Paid attendance of 4,339 and gate receipts of CA$3,040 both set short-lived Toronto hockey records. The Tecumsehs got off to a good start, but at the end of the season were in last place in the six-team NHA in with seven wins and 13 losses. Bellingham sold the bankrupt club to Tom Wall, who renamed the team the Toronto Ontarios.
