= International Professional Hockey League =

North American professional ice hockey league

- Sport: Ice hockey
- Founded: 1904
- First season: 1904
- Folded: 1907
- Country: Canada, US
- Last champion: Houghton-Portage Lakes
- Most titles: Houghton-Portage Lakes(2)

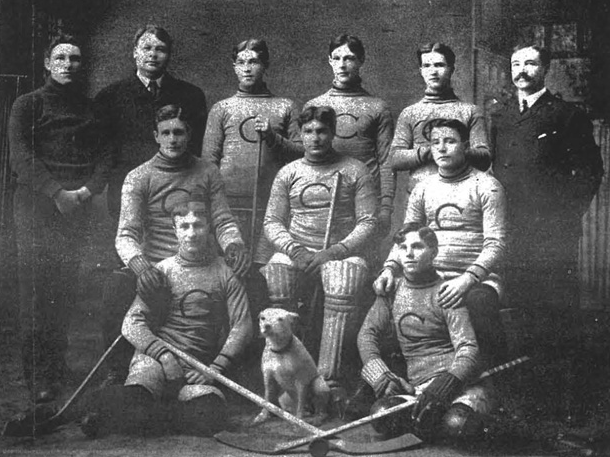
Calumet-Laurium Miners in the 1904–05 season. Front row, left to right: Fred Strike, Ken Mallen. Middle row, left to right: Dr. Bob Scott, Billy Nicholson, Jimmy Gardner. Top row, left to right: Joe Ziehr, Charles Thompson, Reddy McMillan, Hod Stuart, Clarence "Lal" Earls, Johnson Vivian.

The International Professional Hockey League (IPHL) was the first fully professional ice hockey league, operating from 1904 to 1907. It was formed by Jack "Doc" Gibson, a dentist who played hockey throughout Ontario before settling in Houghton, Michigan. The IPHL was a five team circuit which included Pittsburgh, Pennsylvania, Sault Ste. Marie, Ontario, Sault Ste. Marie, Michigan, Calumet, Michigan and Houghton. The IPHL was instrumental in changing the nature of top-level senior men's ice hockey from amateur to professional.

In the time period around 1900, leagues in Canada fought against the professionalization of athletics. John Ross Robertson was quoted in the newspapers of the day as saying "for self preservation, the stand of the Ontario Hockey Association (OHA) against the professionalism of Pittsburgh, Houghton, Calumet and the Soo must be uncompromisingly antagonistic ... Any player who figures on any of these teams must be banished from Ontario Hockey."

Leagues in Canada had been accused of paying individual players for several years and, in fact, Doc Gibson played on a team expelled from the Ontario Hockey Association in 1898 for paying some of its players. However, it was not until the Portage Lakes Hockey Club and the formation of the IPHL in 1904 that any hockey league achieved full-fledged professional status.

== League history ==
In the early 20th century, the mining industry was making huge investments in Northern Michigan. In the fall of 1903, James R. Dee of Houghton started discussions with Western Pennsylvania Hockey League (WPHL) representatives in Pittsburgh regarding the establishment of a national hockey association. Houghton's team had played against Pittsburgh's for a de facto United States national championship in ice hockey.

In 1903–04, the professional Houghton team, without a league of its own, played exhibition games against teams from Sault Ste. Marie, Ontario and Michigan prompting the OHA to ban both the American Soo Indians and Canadian Sault Hockey Club from competing against Canadian amateur teams. As a result, the two teams had nowhere to go but to the proposed professional league.

A meeting was held on November 5, 1904 which included prominent business leaders from Pittsburgh, Sault Ste. Marie, Ontario and Northern Michigan. A number of cities were considered for this new professional league including Montreal, Detroit, Chicago, Minneapolis, St. Paul, Milwaukee, Grand Rapids, and Duluth. However, the league accepted teams from Houghton, Pittsburgh, the two Soos, and Calumet. The representatives of the Canadian Soo suggested a revenue sharing plan that would divide gate receipts in a 60–40 home-visitor split. This revenue sharing plan would make the long journey to Pittsburgh possible, considering that team played at the 5,000-seat capacity Duquesne Garden. The WPHL, which had been paying players to play ice hockey since 1901, put its best professionals into one team, the Pittsburgh Pros, and dissolved.

The Houghton Portage Lakes team played at what was a new facility at the time called the Amphidrome on Portage Lake. The Calumet-Laurium Miners, a nearby rival of the Houghton team, played at the new Palestra arena in Laurium. By contrast, Sault Ste. Marie, Michigan made the Ridge Street Ice-A-Torium, the local curling club, its home rink. The Sault Ste. Marie, Ontario team, or Canadian Soo as it was called, also played at its local curling rink.

The IPHL attracted some of the best players from established Canadian amateur leagues. Every player received a minimum salary of at least $15 to $40 a week, with many also getting lucrative jobs in the community. Ottawa's Hod Stuart, was paid $1,800 by the Calumet Miners to play for the team and manage their rink for the 1904–05 season. Frederick "Cyclone" Taylor was enticed into the league with a salary offer of $400 plus expenses. Taylor would later hail the league as helping him developing into a better hockey player:

"[the] league was a wonderful testing and training ground, and I was a far better player for my experience there. It was good, scientific hockey, but robust enough to teach a young player how to take care of himself. . . . After that league, I knew I could handle anybody, anywhere. It was a marvellous maturing process."

With the hockey season only lasting a couple of months a year because teams played on natural ice, most of the players went home to their families and regular jobs in Canada at the end of each season. In many cases, this meant that IPHL managers would have to organize completely new teams each season.

The Calumet Miners won the first league championship in 1905. In 1906 and 1907, the title went to Houghton-Portage Lakes.

After the 1906–07 season, Canada finally established individual professional teams and, soon after, leagues were formed drawing back many players to play for their home crowds. In addition, it was apparent that, while the league was talking about expanding to larger centres such as Toronto, Cleveland and Duluth, there were problems among the existing clubs. The Pittsburgh franchise was seeking a league closer to home to play in and the champion Houghton-Portage Lakes club wasn't interested in another season.

The other teams were still making plans for another season in 1907–08. Canadian Soo re-signed Ambrose Degray, Hugh Lehman, Newsy Lalonde, Edwin "Dutch" Schaefer and Jack Marks. However, on November 4, 1907, Michigan Soo pulled out of the league citing a lack of players and the IPHL folded. The Pittsburgh team would be dissolved and the WPHL was restarted.

== Gallery ==
Some of the high profile players who played in the IPHL:

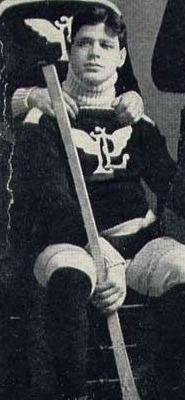
Jack Gibson with the Portage Lakes Hockey Club

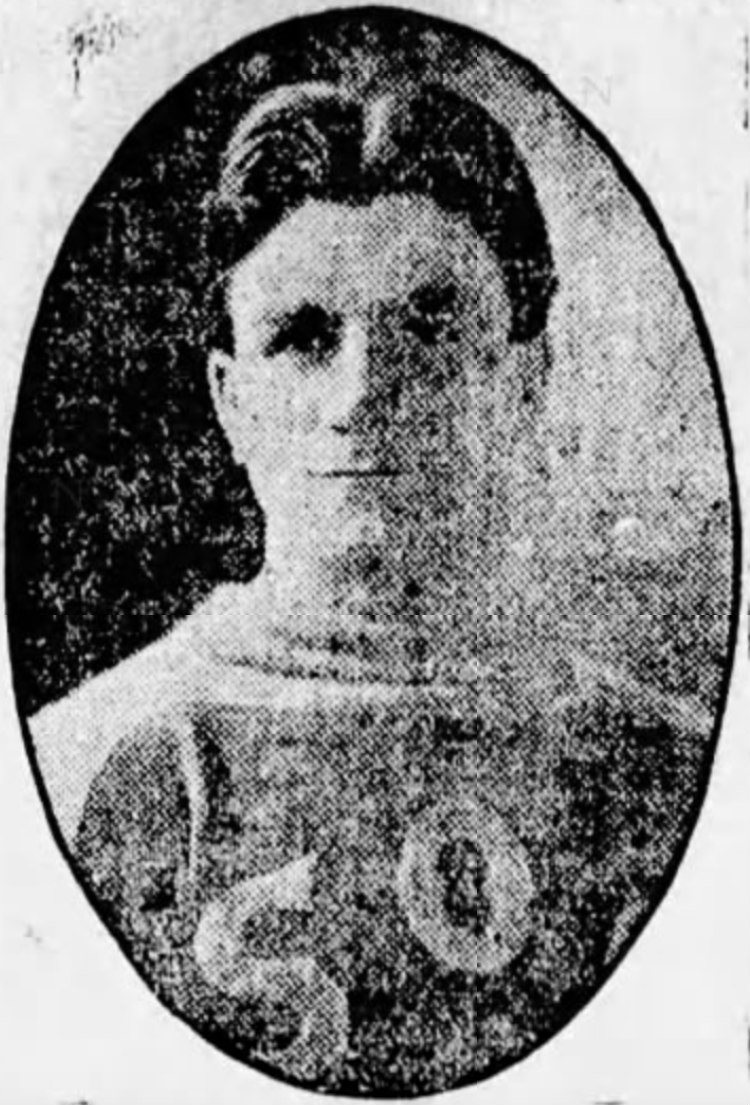
Jack Laviolette with the Michigan Soo Indians

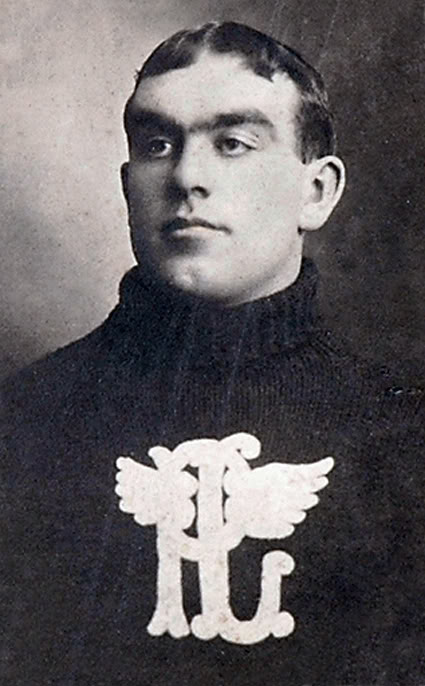
Cyclone Taylor with the Portage Lakes Hockey Club

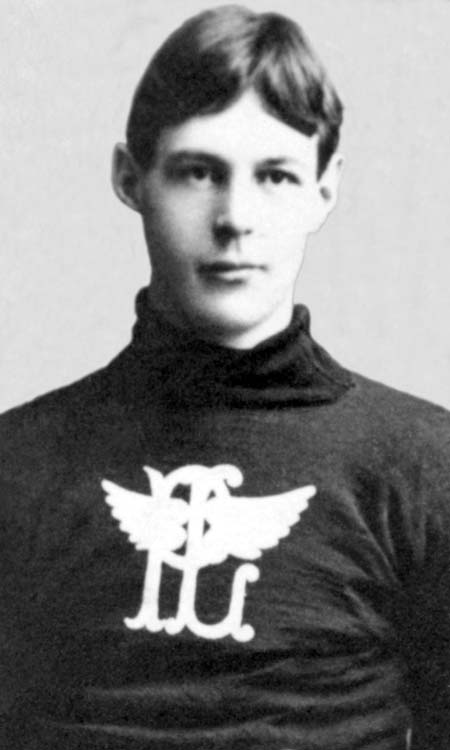
Hod Stuart with the Portage Lakes Hockey Club

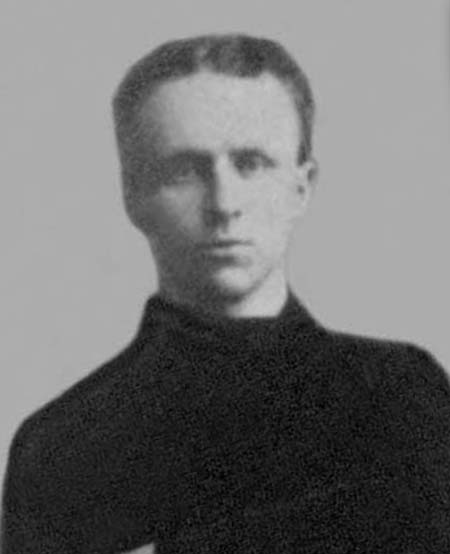
William "Lady" Taylor with the Canadian Soo

== Teams ==
Season	Teams	Champion
1904–05	Calumet-Laurium Miners, Canadian Soo, Houghton-Portage Lakes, Michigan Soo Indians, Pittsburgh Pro HC	Calumet-Laurium Miners
1905–06	Calumet Miners, Canadian Soo, Houghton-Portage Lakes, Michigan Soo Indians, Pittsburgh Pro HC	Houghton-Portage Lakes
1906–07	Calumet Miners, Canadian Soo, Houghton-Portage Lakes, Michigan Soo Indians, Pittsburgh Pro HC	Houghton-Portage Lakes

== Prominent players ==
The following players are members of the Hockey Hall of Fame:

- Jimmy Gardner
- Jack Gibson
- Joe Hall
- Riley Hern
- Newsy Lalonde
- Hugh Lehman
- Jack Laviolette
- George McNamara
- Didier Pitre
- Oliver Seibert
- Tommy Smith
- Bruce Stuart
- Hod Stuart
- Cyclone Taylor
- Marty Walsh

== See also ==
- Western Pennsylvania Hockey League

== Bibliography ==
- Whitehead, Eric (1977), Cyclone Taylor: A Hockey Legend, Toronto: Doubleday Canada, ISBN 0-385-13063-5
