= Billy Nicholson (ice hockey) =

Canadian ice hockey player and executive

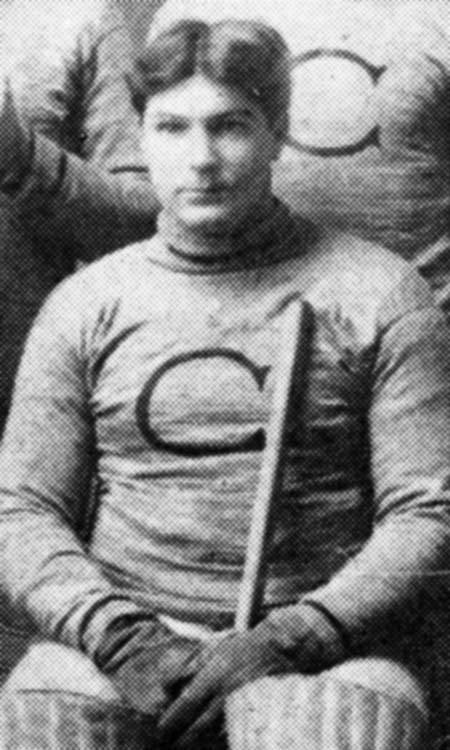
- Nicholson with the Calumet Miners
- Born: September 19, 1878 Montreal, Quebec, Canada
- Died: May 5, 1947 (aged 68) Miami Beach, Florida, U.S.
- Height: 5 ft 10 in (178 cm)
- Weight: 220 lb (100 kg; 15 st 10 lb)
- Position: Goaltender
- Caught: Left
- Played for: Montreal Hockey Club; Montreal Wanderers; Calumet Miners; Montreal Shamrocks; Haileybury Comets; Toronto Tecumsehs; Toronto Hockey Club
- Playing career: 1899–1917

William Charles Nicholson (September 19, 1878 – May 5, 1947) was a Canadian professional ice hockey player and executive. He played goaltender and was a Stanley Cup champion with the Montreal Hockey Club in 1902 as an amateur. He later became a professional player and was the first general manager of the Toronto Tecumsehs of the National Hockey Association (NHA).

== Playing career ==
Nicholson joined the Montreal Hockey Club senior ice hockey team in 1899, winning a Stanley Cup with the team in 1902 on a team dubbed the "Little Men of Iron." He played with the team until 1903, when he left with a number of other Montreals to form the Montreal Wanderers. He played one season with the Wanderers before turning professional with the Calumet Miners of the International Hockey League.

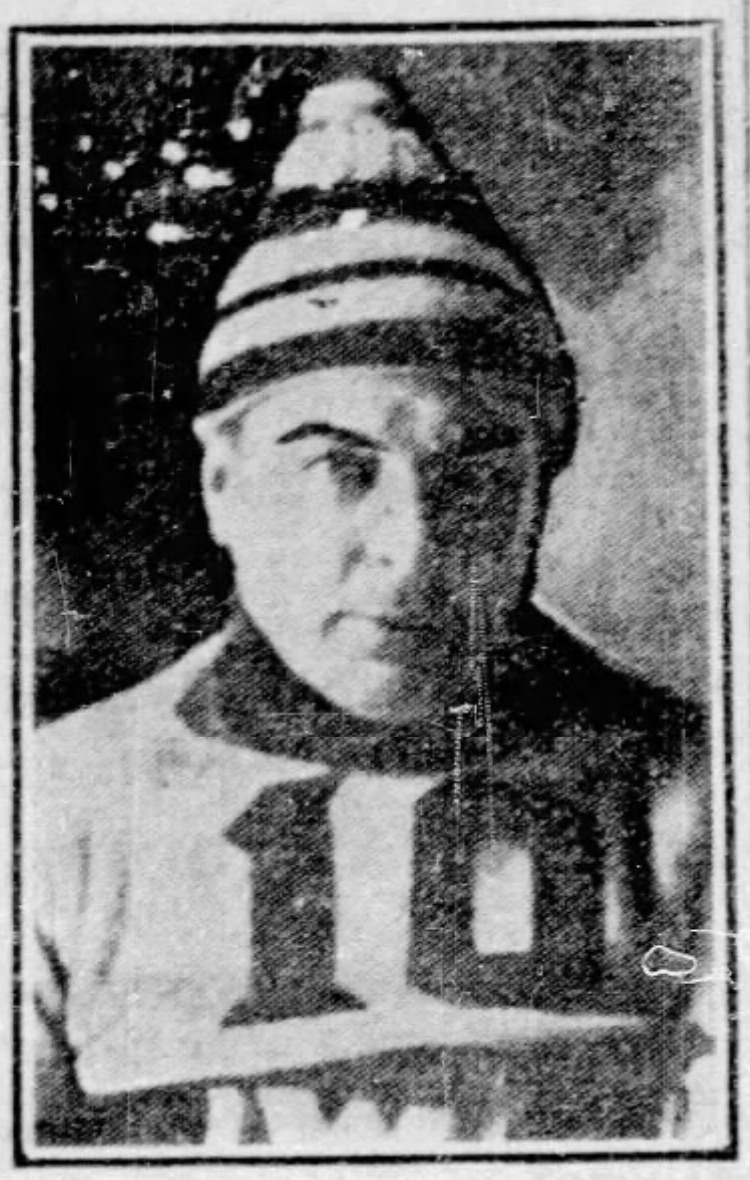
Nicholson during his second stint with the Montreal Wanderers, in 1913–14.

Nicholson returned to Canada in 1907 to play a season with the Montreal Shamrocks. He signed on with the Haileybury Hockey Club of the Timiskaming Professional Hockey League for the 1908–09 season, and also played hockey for the Edmonton Pros. He played two more seasons with Haileybury, staying with the club after it left the National Hockey Association.

Nicholson signed with the Toronto Tecumsehs in 1911, but the team did not play until 1912 due to its arena not being ready. He played and managed the Tecumsehs in 1912–13. The next year, he returned to the Montreal Wanderers for one season. He then took up coaching full-time, although he returned to play for Calumet in 1915–16 and with the Toronto Hockey Club in 1916–17.

In all, Nicholson played 122 games in various professional and amateur leagues, including the National Hockey Association, Eastern Canada Amateur Hockey Association, Canadian Amateur Hockey League, and International Hockey League.

He died in 1947 in Miami Beach, Florida.

== Achievements ==
- Stanley Cup – 1902 (Montreal Hockey Club)
- ECAHA's 2nd All-Star Team – 1907–08
- TPHL's 1st All-Star Team – 1908–09
