= Calumet Miners =

- City: Calumet and Laurium, Michigan
- League: International Professional Hockey League
- Founded: 1904
- Operated: 1904–1907
- Home arena: The Palestra
- Colors: Pearl Gray, Cardinal

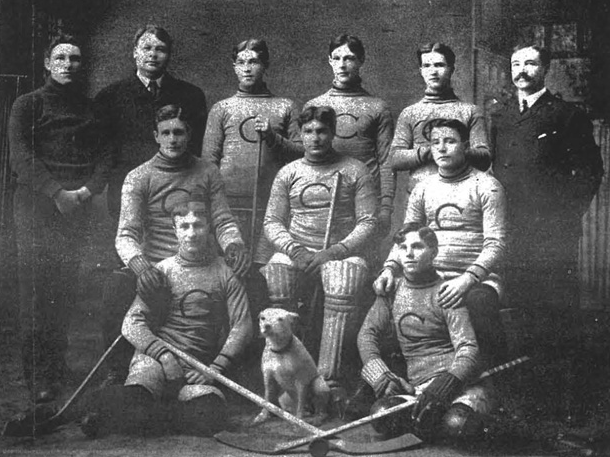
Calumet-Laurium Miners in the 1904–05 season. Front row, left to right: Fred Strike, Ken Mallen. Middle row, left to right: Dr. Bob Scott, Billy Nicholson, Jimmy Gardner. Top row, left to right: Joe Ziehr, Charles Thompson, Reddy McMillan, Hod Stuart, Clarence "Lal" Earls, Johnson Vivian.

The Calumet Miners, also known as the Calumet-Laurium Miners and the Calumet Wanderers, was a professional ice hockey team from Calumet and Laurium, Michigan. The team played for three seasons in the International Professional Hockey League, the first fully professional hockey league in North America, from 1904 to 1907. The league was formed in November 1904 and consisted of five teams; three from Michigan, one from Pennsylvania and one from Ontario in Canada.

Calumet Miners had its best season in the IPHL in its first year, the 1904–05 season, when the team won the championship with 37 points in 24 games, five points in front of the Portage Lakes Hockey Club.

== Notable players ==
Notable players who dressed up for the Calumet Miners were Hockey Hall of Fame members Hod Stuart and Jimmy Gardner.
