= William "Lady" Taylor =

Canadian ice hockey player

William Taylor
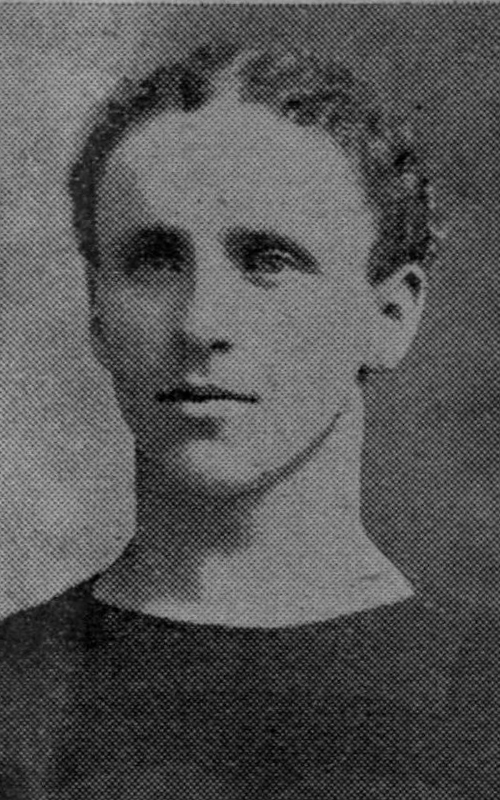
- Taylor with the Brantford Lacrosse Club
- Born: May 15, 1880 Paris, Ontario, Canada
- Died: April 24, 1942 (aged 61) Hamilton, Ontario, Canada
- Height: 5 ft 6 in (168 cm)
- Position: Center; Rover
- Played for: Brantford Hockey Club; Paris Hockey Club; Canadian Soo Algonquins; Michigan Soo Indians; Brantford Indians; St. Catharines Pros; Berlin Dutchmen; Cobalt Silver Kings; Pittsburgh Athletic Club; Portage Plains Cities
- Playing career: 1901–1911

William Charles "Lady, Billy" Taylor (May 15, 1880 – April 24, 1942) was a Canadian professional ice hockey and lacrosse player who played 96 games in various professional hockey leagues, including the International Professional Hockey League (IPHL) and Ontario Professional Hockey League (OPHL). He was born in Paris, Ontario.

== Career ==
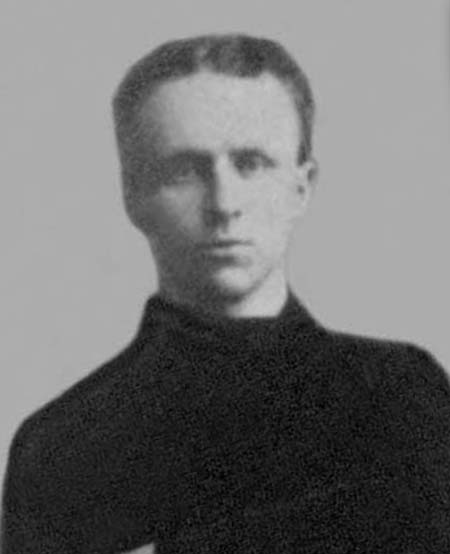
Taylor while with the Canadian Soo

Amongst the professional ice hockey teams Taylor played with were the Canadian Soo Algonquins and the Michigan Soo Indians of the IPHL. Taylor also represented the Brantford Indians, St. Catharines Pros and Berlin Dutchmen of the OPHL. Prior to his exploits in professional hockey Taylor played as an amateur with Brantford and Paris clubs in the Ontario Hockey Association. He was also concurrently a lacrosse player.

In the 1906–07 IPHL season Taylor led the league with 46 goals and 64 points in 24 games. In the three-year history of the IPHL only Lorne Campbell of the Pittsburgh Professionals scored more goals than Taylor, with 108 and 99 goals respectively, but in 15 more games played.

In the 1908 OPHL season Taylor scored 28 goals in 12 games for the Brantford Indians which placed him second in the league, only behind future Hockey Hall of Fame inductee Newsy Lalonde of the Toronto Professionals who scored 32 goals in 9 games.

As a lacrosse player, Taylor played as a centre fielder, and was known as one of the speediest players in the game. In 1903 he was a member of the Brantford Lacrosse Club which finished as runner-ups to the Montreal Shamrocks for the Minto Cup.

== Playing style ==
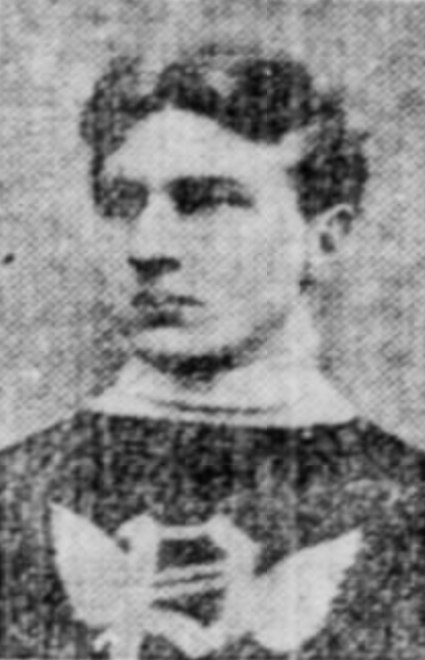
Garnet Sixsmith

Over the course of his career in hockey, "Lady" Taylor primarily worked the two mid-ice forward positions, the centre forward and rover positions, from where he scored the majority of his goals. While standing at a fairly modest 5 feet and 6 inches, he more than compensated for his lack of stature with a rough and rowdy side to his game, or sometimes outright violent.

Fellow IPHL player Garnet Sixsmith, in 1931, told a story in the Pittsburgh Press how Taylor once had threatened to break his leg before a game at the Duquesne Garden in Pittsburgh, and then fulfilled on his promise with Sixsmith being carried off the ice with his leg broken in three different places.

Taylor's rowdy or violent on-ice demeanour was sometimes mirrored off the ice as well, and in October 1908 he was fined $50 or three months in jail by Magistrate Livingston in Brantford, Ontario on a charge of threatening to shoot his estranged wife, and for having a loaded revolver in his possession for that purpose. Taylor had been warned twice by the magistrate to leave the city, but had instead showed up at his wife's house flourishing a revolver and allegedly told her "Let's have a tragedy, and die together." He was also bound over in $1,000 surety to keep the peace in Brantford for two years.

== Military duty ==
After his ice hockey career had ended Taylor enlisted with the Black Watch Regiment in Montreal and served with the 42nd Battalion during World War I in England and France between 1915 and 1917. He returned wounded to Canada with both a bullet and shrapnel in his body, and also had a silver plate inserted in his skull.

== Statistics ==
Fit-Ref = Fit-Reform Trophy, SPHL = Saskatchewan Professional Hockey League, EOPHL = Eastern Ontario Professional Hockey League, NOHL = New Ontario Hockey League

			Regular season					Playoffs
Season	Team	League	GP	G	A	Pts	PIM	GP	G	A	Pts	PIM
1904–05	Canadian Soo Algonquins	IPHL	24	35	0	35	21	–	–	–	–	–
1905–06	Canadian Soo Algonquins	IPHL	10	13	0	13	22	–	–	–	–	–
	Michigan Soo Indians	IPHL	4	5	0	5	12	–	–	–	–	–
1906–07	Canadian Soo Algonquins	IPHL	24	46	18	64	50	–	–	–	–	–
	Cobalt Silver Kings	TPHL	3	7	0	7	3	–	–	–	–	–
1907–08	Portage Plains Cities	Fit-Ref	–	–	–	–	–	1	0	0	0	0
1908	Brantford Indians	OPHL	12	28	0	28	12	–	–	–	–	–
1908–09	Pittsburgh Athletic Club	WPHL	2	1	0	1	0	–	–	–	–	–
	New Liskeard	TPHL	2	1	0	1	0	–	–	–	–	–
1909	St. Catharines Pros	OPHL	1	0	0	0	0	–	–	–	–	–
	Berlin Dutchmen	OPHL	2	4	0	4	7	–	–	–	–	–
1909–10
1910–11	Port Arthur Athletics	EOPHL	1	0	0	0	0	–	–	–	–	–
	Port Arthur Thunder Bays	NOHL	5	4	0	4	3	–	–	–	–	–
IPHL totals			62	99	18	117	105	–	–	–	–	–
OPHL totals			15	32	0	32	19	–	–	–	–	–

Statistics per Society for International Hockey Research at sihrhockey.org
