= Jack Ward (ice hockey) =

Canadian ice hockey player

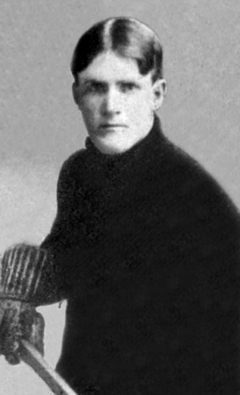
- Born: Rat Portage, Ontario, Canada
- Weight: 135 lb (61 kg; 9 st 9 lb)
- Position: Center; Left wing
- Shot: Left
- Played for: Canadian Soo Algonquins; Michigan Soo Indians; Brantford Indians; Montreal Shamrocks; Port Arthur Lake City
- Playing career: c. 1902–1912

John Ward was a Canadian professional ice hockey forward who was active in the early 1900s. Amongst the teams Ward played for were the Canadian Soo Algonquins, Michigan Soo Indians, Brantford Indians, Montreal Shamrocks and the Port Arthur Lake City. Despite his small stature, weighing only around 135 pounds, Ward was a prolific scorer in the IPHL, OPHL and the NOHL.

Ward was born in the city of Kenora in northwestern Ontario, then known as Rat Portage.

== Statistics ==
Exh. = Exhibition games, NOHL = New Ontario Hockey League

			Regular season					Playoffs
Season	Team	League	GP	G	A	Pts	PIM	GP	G	A	Pts	PIM
1903–04	Canadian Soo Pros	Exh.	5	5	0	5	0	–	–	–	–	–
1904–05	Canadian Soo Algonquins	IPHL	22	13	0	13	4	–	–	–	–	–
1905–06	Canadian Soo Algonquins	IPHL	15	10	0	10	8	–	–	–	–	–
1906–07	Michigan Soo Indians	IPHL	23	33	8	41	12	–	–	–	–	–
1908	Brantford Indians	OPHL	12	14	0	14	6	–	–	–	–	–
1909	Brantfors Indians	OPHL	12	25	0	25	16	–	–	–	–	–
1909	Montreal Shamrocks	ECHA	3	7	2	9	6	–	–	–	–	–
1909–10	Fort William Forts	NOHL	12	21	0	21	12	–	–	–	–	–
	Fort William North Stars	NOHL	1	0	0	0	0	–	–	–	–	–
1910–11	Fort William Forts	NOHL	15	39	0	39	22	–	–	–	–	–
	Port Arthur Lake City	Stanley Cup	–	–	–	–	–	1	1	0	1	3
1911–12	Fort William North Stars	NOHL	13	17	0	17	21	–	–	–	–	–
IPHL totals			60	56	8	64	24	–	–	–	–	–
OPHL totals			24	39	0	39	22	–	–	–	–	–
NOHL totals			41	77	0	77	55	–	–	–	–	–

Statistics per Society for International Hockey Research at sihrhockey.org
