= Jack Marks (ice hockey) =

Canadian ice hockey player

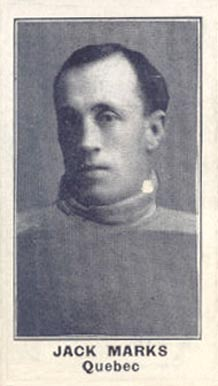
- Marks with the Quebec Bulldogs.
- Born: February 8, 1882 Brantford, Ontario, Canada
- Died: August 19, 1945 (aged 63)
- Height: 6 ft 1 in (185 cm)
- Weight: 180 lb (82 kg; 12 st 12 lb)
- Position: Right Wing
- Shot: Left
- Played for: Canadian Soo (IPHL); Brantford Indians (OPHL); Toronto (OPHL); All-Montreal (CHA); Quebec Bulldogs (NHA); Montreal Wanderers (NHL); Toronto Arenas (NHL); Quebec Bulldogs (NHL)
- Playing career: 1904–1920

John Joseph Marks (February 8, 1882 – August 19, 1945) was a Canadian professional ice hockey player who played professional ice hockey from 1906 until 1920, including 2 seasons in the National Hockey League for the Montreal Wanderers, Torontos and Quebec Bulldogs. He won 2 Stanley Cups with the Quebec Bulldogs in 1912 and 1913. He also won a third Stanley Cup with Toronto in 1918. He was born in Brantford, Ontario.

== Playing career ==
Marks began intermediate-level play for Belleville of the Ontario Hockey Association (OHA) in 1899. He would play for Belleville for four seasons until 1904. He was suspended for a year in 1903 for playing professional baseball in 1902. When the Federal Amateur Hockey League (FAHL) started in 1904, he joined the Brockville team for two seasons. At the end of 1906, he signed up for New Glasgow's Stanley Cup challenge. For the 1907 season, he became a professional with the Canadian Soo team of the International Professional Hockey League (IPHL). In the 1907–08 hockey season, he started with the Pittsburgh Lyceum of the Western Pennsylvania Hockey League, and jumped after three games to Brantford of the Ontario Professional Hockey League (OPHL), eventually playing in the Toronto PHC's Stanley Cup challenge.

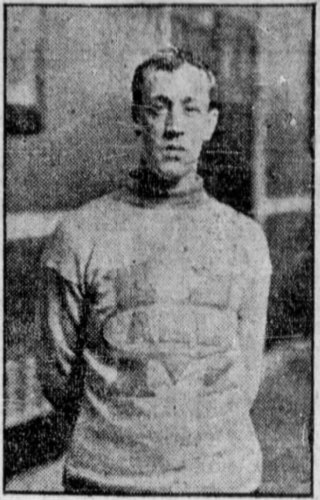
Marks with All-Montreal HC in 1909–10.

He played for Brantford in 1909, and jumped to the ill-fated Canadian Hockey Association (CHA) for four games with the All-Montreal Hockey Club, returning to Brantford after the CHA demise. In 1911, he played again in the United States, playing a season of exhibition for a Chicago professional team that was attempting to start professional hockey in Chicago.

In 1911, he returned to Canada, to join the Quebec Bulldogs of the National Hockey Association, playing six seasons of the club, winners of the Stanley Cup in 1912 and 1913. When Quebec did not play in the NHL's first season of 1917–18, he was drafted to the Montreal Wanderers from Quebec for the start of the inaugural 1917–18 NHL season. After the Wanderers folded, he was assigned to the Canadiens but was loaned to the Toronto club, winning the 1918 Stanley Cup. He did not play in 1918–19 but attempted a comeback in the 1919–20 season when Quebec AC activated a team in the NHL, playing only one further game.

=== 1909 train accident ===
During the 1908–09 season, while with the Brantford Indians of the OPHL, Marks and the Indians were involved in a train accident outside of Guelph on January 14, 1909, where Marks suffered season-ending injuries (broken arm and fractured ribs) when the rear coach of the Grand Trunk Railway passenger train they were traveling with ran into a ditch and overturned.

== Career statistics ==
=== Regular season and playoffs ===
			Regular season					Playoffs
Season	Team	League	GP	G	A	Pts	PIM	GP	G	A	Pts	PIM
1901–02	Belleville Intermediates	OHA	—	—	—	—	—	—	—	—	—	—
1903–04	Belleville Intermediates	OHA	—	—	—	—	—	—	—	—	—	—
1904–05	Brockville HC	FAHL	8	6	0	6	—	—	—	—	—	—
1905–06	Brockville HC	FAHL	6	1	0	1	—	—	—	—	—	—
1906–07	New Glasgow Cubs	St-Cup	—	—	—	—	—	1	2	0	2	—
1906–07	Canadian Soo	IHL	14	13	10	23	26	—	—	—	—	—
1907–08	Pittsburgh Lyceum	WPHL	—	—	—	—	—	—	—	—	—	—
1907–08	Brantford Indians	OPHL	10	10	0	10	31	—	—	—	—	—
1907–08	Toronto Pros	St-Cup	—	—	—	—	—	1	0	0	0	0
1908–09	Brantford Indians	OPHL	9	6	0	6	19	—	—	—	—	—
1909–10	All-Montreal	CHA	4	7	0	7	3	—	—	—	—	—
1909–10	Brantford Indians	OPHL	4	8	0	8	15	—	—	—	—	—
1910–11	Chicago All-Americans	CCPHL	—	—	—	—	—	—	—	—	—	—
1911–12	Quebec Bulldogs	NHA	10	4	0	4	10	—	—	—	—	—
1911–12	Quebec Bulldogs	St-Cup	—	—	—	—	—	2	0	0	0	2
1912–13	Quebec Bulldogs	NHA	19	18	0	18	39	—	—	—	—	—
1912–13	Quebec Bulldogs	St-Cup	—	—	—	—	—	1	2	0	2	0
1913–14	Quebec Bulldogs	NHA	20	9	6	15	32	—	—	—	—	—
1914–15	Quebec Bulldogs	NHA	17	7	4	11	49	—	—	—	—	—
1915–16	Quebec Bulldogs	NHA	23	12	0	12	40	—	—	—	—	—
1916–17	Quebec Bulldogs	NHA	16	0	0	0	6	—	—	—	—	—
1917–18	Montreal Wanderers	NHL	1	0	0	0	0	—	—	—	—	—
1917–18	Toronto Arenas	NHL	5	0	0	0	0	—	—	—	—	—
1919–20	Quebec Bulldogs	NHL	1	0	0	0	4	—	—	—	—	—
NHA totals			105	50	10	60	176	—	—	—	—	—
NHL totals			7	0	0	0	4	—	—	—	—	—
