= Roy Brown (ice hockey) =

Canadian ice hockey player

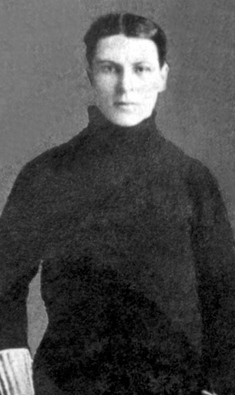
- Born: December 13, 1880 Mitchell, Ontario, Canada
- Died: September 3, 1950 (aged 69)
- Position: Cover point
- Shot: Right
- Played for: Canadian Soo Algonquins; Brantford Indians; Berlin Dutchmen
- Playing career: c. 1902–1911

Roy Townley Brown (December 13, 1880 – September 3, 1950) was a Canadian professional ice hockey defenseman who was active in the early 1900s. Amongst the teams Brown played for were the Brantford Indians and the Berlin Dutchmen of the OPHL, as well as the Canadian Soo Algonquins of the IPHL where he acted both as team captain and coach.

He was born in Mitchell, Ontario.

== Statistics ==
Exh. = Exhibition games

			Regular season					Playoffs
Season	Team	League	GP	G	A	Pts	PIM	GP	G	A	Pts	PIM
1904–05	Canadian Soo Algonquins	IPHL	24	9	0	9	8	–	–	–	–	–
1905–06	Toronto Professionals	Exh.	–	–	–	–	–	–	–	–	–	–
1906–07	Canadian Soo Algonquins	IPHL	22	7	8	15	18	–	–	–	–	–
1908	Brantford Indians	OPHL	12	6	0	6	40	–	–	–	–	–
1909	Brantfors Indians	OPHL	1	0	0	0	0	–	–	–	–	–
1909–10			–	–	–	–	–	–	–	–	–	–
1911	Berlin Dutchmen	OPHL	1	0	0	0	0	–	–	–	–	–
IPHL totals			46	16	8	24	26	–	–	–	–	–
OPHL totals			14	6	0	6	40	–	–	–	–	–

Statistics per Society for International Hockey Research at sihrhockey.org
