= Rowley Young =

Canadian ice hockey player

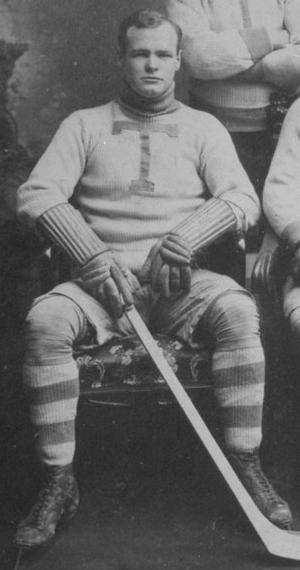
- Rowley Young with the Toronto Professionals in the 1906–07 season.
- Born: January 12, 1883 Waterloo, Ontario, Canada
- Died: March 21, 1961 (aged 78)
- Position: Cover point
- Played for: Toronto Marlboros; Cobalt Silver Kings; Pittsburgh Professionals; Toronto Professionals; Montreal Hockey Club; Berlin Dutchmen; Waterloo Colts
- Playing career: 1904–1910

Roland Wilbur "Rowley, Rolly" Young (January 12, 1883 – March 21, 1961) was a Canadian professional ice hockey player active in the early 1900s. Amongst the teams he played for were the Cobalt Silver Kings, Pittsburgh Professionals, Toronto Professionals, Montreal Hockey Club and Berlin Dutchmen. Young played at the cover point position, equivalent to the modern day defenseman. He was born in Waterloo, Ontario.

In March 1908 Rowley Young played with the Toronto Professionals, champions of the OPHL, in a challenge game for the Stanley Cup against the Montreal Wanderers from the ECAHA. Despite two goals from star forward Newsy Lalonde Toronto lost the game 4-6 due to two late goals from Wanderers Moose Johnson and Bruce Stuart.

== Awards and honours ==
- OPHL Champion – 1907–08 with the Toronto Professionals.
- OPHL First All-Star Team – 1907–08
