= Bert Morrison =

Canadian ice hockey player

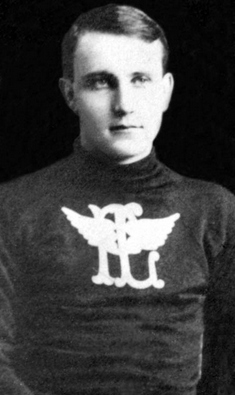
- Bert Morrison with the Portage Lakes Hockey Club.
- Born: January 10, 1880 Toronto, Ontario, Canada
- Died: April 23, 1969 (aged 89)
- Height: 5 ft 7 in (170 cm)
- Weight: 160 lb (73 kg; 11 st 6 lb)
- Position: Rover
- Shot: Left
- Played for: Pittsburgh Keystones; New York Athletic Club; Portage Lakes Hockey Club; Calumet Miners; Montreal Shamrocks; Toronto Professionals; Montreal Wanderers
- Playing career: c. 1900–1912

Bertram Clifford "Bert" Morrison (January 10, 1880 – April 23, 1969) was a Canadian professional ice hockey rover from Toronto, who was active with several clubs in the early 1900s. Amongst the teams Morrison played for were the Pittsburgh Keystones, Portage Lakes Hockey Club, Calumet Miners, Montreal Shamrocks, Toronto Professionals and Montreal Wanderers.

== Career ==
Bert Morrison was educated at Upper Canada College in his hometown of Toronto, where he also played on the school hockey team. He started out his senior career on the semi-professional ice hockey circuit in the 1901–02 season when he played for the Pittsburgh Keystones in the Western Pennsylvania Hockey League. Amongst his teammates on the Keystones that season were Riley Hern and Harry Peel, with Peel later admitting to being paid money to play for the team. Morrison himself were investigated on the same matter by the Ontario Rugby Football Union and the Ontario Hockey Association after playing a game with Toronto against London.

In the 1903–04 season Morrison scored a total number of 94 goals in 25 games with the Portage Lakes Hockey Club, playing alongside future Hockey Hall of Fame members Hod Stuart, Bruce Stuart, Riley Hern and Jack Gibson.

== Post career ==
Morrison enlisted with the Canadian armed forces for service in World War 1 in 1915. He was both gassed and shell-shocked during battles in France, as well as held prisoner of war in Germany, before returning to Canada in February 1919.

His military attestation papers listed his occupation as a brass manufacturer. His military papers post service also reported on him suffering from mental health issues, including hallucinations, probably worsened by his time overseas.

Morrison died in 1969, aged 89, and is buried at Mount Pleasant Cemetery in Toronto.

== Statistics ==
Exh. = Exhibition games, NYSHL = New York Senior Hockey League

			Regular season					Playoffs
Season	Team	League	GP	G	A	Pts	PIM	GP	G	A	Pts	PIM
1901–02	Pittsburgh Keystones	Exh.	7	11	2	13	2	–	–	–	–	–
		WPHL	13	10	4	14	8	–	–	–	–	–
1902–03			–	–	–	–	–	–	–	–	–	–
1903–04	Portage Lakes Hockey Club	Exh.	14	68	0	68	4	–	–	–	–	–
		US Pro	–	–	–	–	–	9	24	0	24	6
		World Pro	–	–	–	–	–	2	2	0	2	4
1904–05	Portage Lakes Hockey Club	IPHL	12	10	0	10	8	–	–	–	–	–
1905–06	Toronto Professionals	Exh.	–	–	–	–	–	–	–	–	–	–
1906–07	Calumet Miners	IPHL	22	28	7	35	31	–	–	–	–	–
1907–08	Montreal Shamrocks	ECAHA	7	12	1	13	15	–	–	–	–	–
	Montreal Wanderers	World Pro	–	–	–	–	–	1	0	–	0	–
1908	Toronto Professionals	OPHL	9	22	0	22	22	–	–	–	–	–
	Toronto Professionals	Stanley Cup	–	–	–	–	–	1	0	0	0	0
1908–09			–	–	–	–	–	–	–	–	–	–
1909–10			–	–	–	–	–	–	–	–	–	–
1910–11			–	–	–	–	–	–	–	–	–	–
1911–12	Toronto Professionals	Exh.	1	1	0	1	–	–	–	–	–	–
IPHL totals			34	38	7	45	39	–	–	–	–	–

Statistics per Society for International Hockey Research at sihrhockey.org
