= Charles Collins (ice hockey) =

Canadian ice hockey player

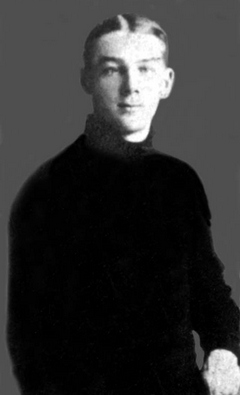
- Born: September 18, 1882 Collingwood, Ontario, Canada
- Died: July 28, 1920 (aged 37)
- Position: Right wing
- Shot: Right
- Played for: Canadian Soo Algonquins; St. Catharines Pros; Toronto Tecumsehs
- Playing career: c. 1903–1912

Charles Collins (September 18, 1882 – July 28, 1920) was a Canadian professional ice hockey forward who was active in the early 1900s.

== Early life ==
Collins was born in Collingwood, Ontario.

== Career ==
Amongst the teams Collins played for were the Canadian Soo Algonquins of the IPHL and the St. Catharines Pros of the OPHL. Collins also played in one exhibition game for the Toronto Tecumsehs.

In the 1904–05 season, in the notoriously rough IPHL, Collins was the only regular player that went unpenalized.

== Statistics ==
Exh. = Exhibition games

			Regular season					Playoffs
Season	Team	League	GP	G	A	Pts	PIM	GP	G	A	Pts	PIM
1904–05	Canadian Soo Algonquins	IPHL	22	22	0	22	0	–	–	–	–	–
1909	St. Catharines Pros	OPHL	5	2	0	2	0	–	–	–	–	–
1911–12	Toronto Tecumsehs	Exh.	1	0	0	0	0	–	–	–	–	–

Statistics per Society for International Hockey Research at sihrhockey.org
