= Walter Miller (ice hockey) =

Canadian ice hockey player

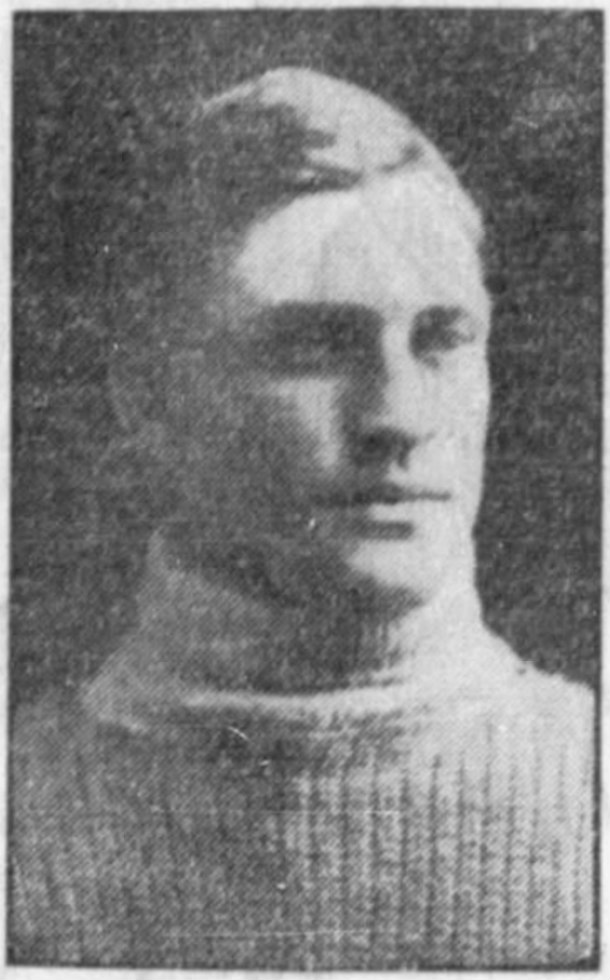
- Miller in 1908–09 with Brantford Indians
- Born: September 25, 1887 Peterborough, Ontario, Canada
- Died: December 19, 1959 (aged 72)
- Height: 6 ft 0 in (183 cm)
- Weight: 185 lb (84 kg; 13 st 3 lb)
- Position: Centre
- Shot: Left
- Played for: Montreal Wanderers; Ottawa Senators
- Playing career: 1906–1914

Walter "Gid" Miller (September 25, 1887 – December 19, 1959) was a Canadian professional ice hockey centre. He played with the Montreal Wanderers and Ottawa Senators of the National Hockey Association. He appeared in 10 games for the Wanderers in the 1912–13 and 1913–14 seasons, and two games for the Senators in the 1913–14 season.

During the 1908–09 season, while with the Brantford Indians of the OPHL, Miller and the Indians were involved in a train accident outside of Guelph on January 14, 1909, where Miller suffered a season ending hand injury (cut off finger) when the rear coach of the Grand Trunk Railway passenger train they were traveling with ran into a ditch and overturned.
