= Mutual Street Rink =

Sports arena

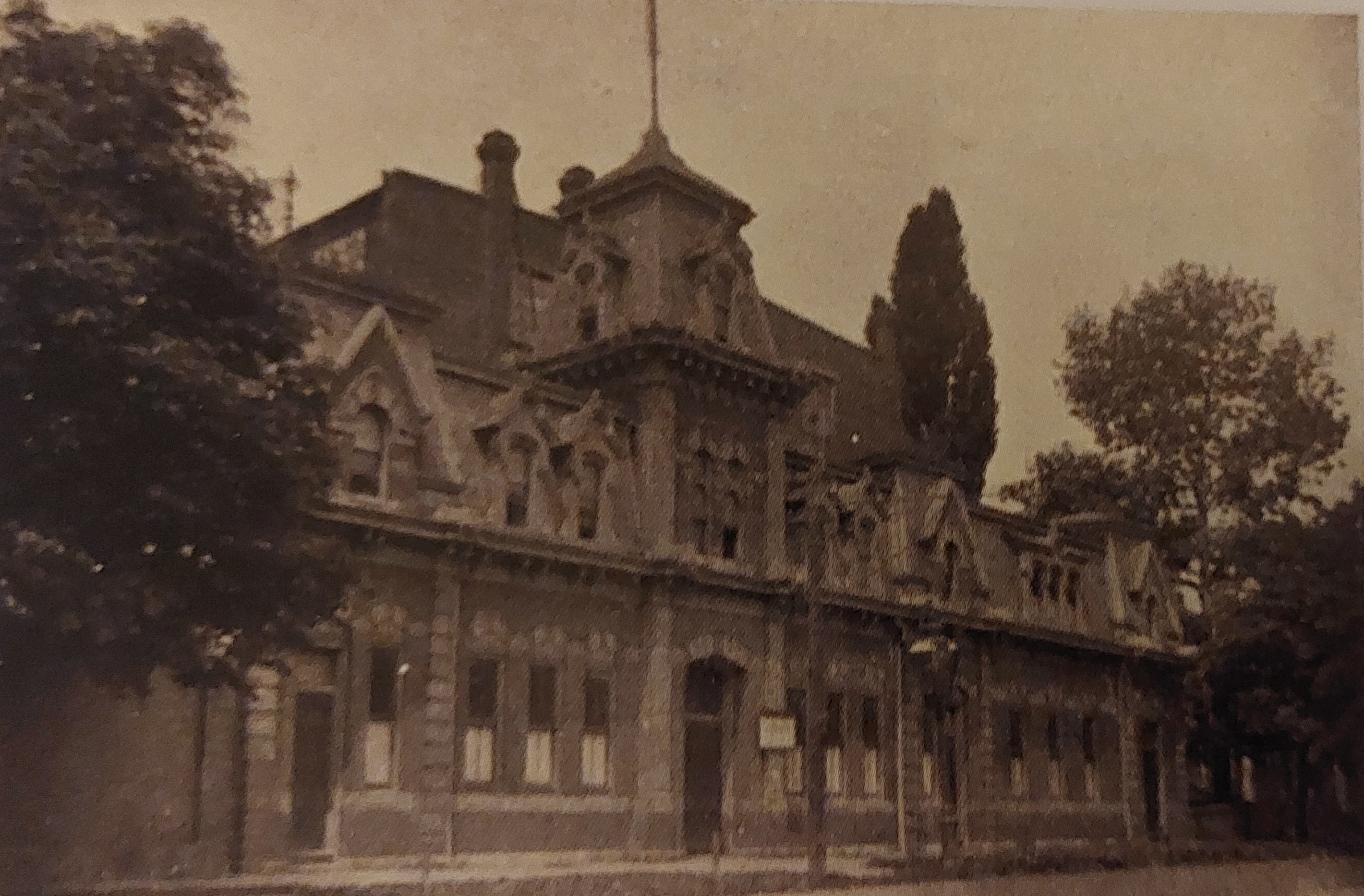
- Exterior of Caledonian Skating and Curling Club
- Interactive map of Mutual Street Rink
- Location: 78 Mutual Street, Toronto, Ontario, Canada
- Coordinates: 43.65602487585774°N 79.37554371523848°W
- Surface: natural ice
- Field size: 153 ft, 4 inches x 73 ft, 5 inches (surface)

Construction
- Opened: 1875
- Demolished: 1912

Tenant
- Toronto Professional Hockey Club (OPHL) (1908–1909)

The Mutual Street Rink also known as the Caledonian Rink was a curling and skating rink located on Mutual Street in Toronto, Ontario, Canada. It was the primary site of the sport of ice hockey in Toronto from the 1880s until 1912 when it was replaced by the Arena Gardens. In the 1880s, it was considered Toronto's largest auditorium.

== Building ==
The building was opened in December 1875 under the name of the "Caledonian Skating & Curling Rink". The Caledonian Society was a club that celebrated Scottish games, had excursions and celebrated Robert Burns Day. It was an outdoor facility. In 1885, a permanent structure was built to enclose the rink. It opened on December 10 and the first event took place on December 17, a fancy dress carnival.

The rink was like other ice hockey rinks at the time, a large unheated building with a concrete floor, which was flooded with water in the wintertime to create a natural ice rink. At the time of construction, the seating area was a raised floor surrounding the ice. In the summer, the building was used as an auditorium. Its approximate size can be judged by the attendance at church gatherings in the 1880s, which with temporary seating allowed 4,000 to 5,000 to attend. In the 1880s, it was Toronto's largest auditorium.

The Caledonian Club sold the rink to John Palmer, owner of the Toronto Type Foundry, in the fall of 1905, for CA$25,000 (equivalent to $858,966 in 2025). Alexander Miln, former manager of the Toronto Wellingtons ice hockey club was named manager of the rink.

== Usage ==
Two sports were the initial users of the rink, Ice skating and curling. In 1888, the Caledonian Hockey Club was formed and the rink was first used for ice hockey. As the popularity of ice hockey grew, the rink became the primary site of ice hockey in Toronto. 1892 and later Ontario ice hockey championship were played at the rink. Toronto's first professional ice hockey team, the Toronto Professional Hockey Club, began play there in 1906.

When ice was not present, the building was used for other purposes. Boxing was another sport held at the Rink. Fights were held from 1900 until 1902. Rube Ferns defeated Jack Bennett on May 24, 1900 to win a 142 pounds (64 kg) World Welterweight title fight. Ferns would fight Matty Matthews a year later at the rink in another 142 lb. title fight.

In June 1886, a large choral festival of over 1,000 performers, 100-piece orchestra, children's choir, plus soloists was held at the rink. Church gatherings in the 1880s attracted up to 4,000 persons. In 1906, the rink building was the site of one of the first displays of motor cars in Toronto. Over CA$400,000 (equivalent to $13,398,613 in 2025) worth of automobiles were shown.

By the 1910s, the seating capacity for spectators was not sufficient, and the Arena Gardens complex was built on the Mutual Street site. In 1937, the Arena Gardens was renamed the Mutual Street Arena. In 1962, curling would return to the site, when curling sheets were installed at the Arena, which was no longer used for ice hockey. The Arena, by then known as 'The Terrace', was demolished in 1989 with residential highrise and Arena Gardens park on the site.

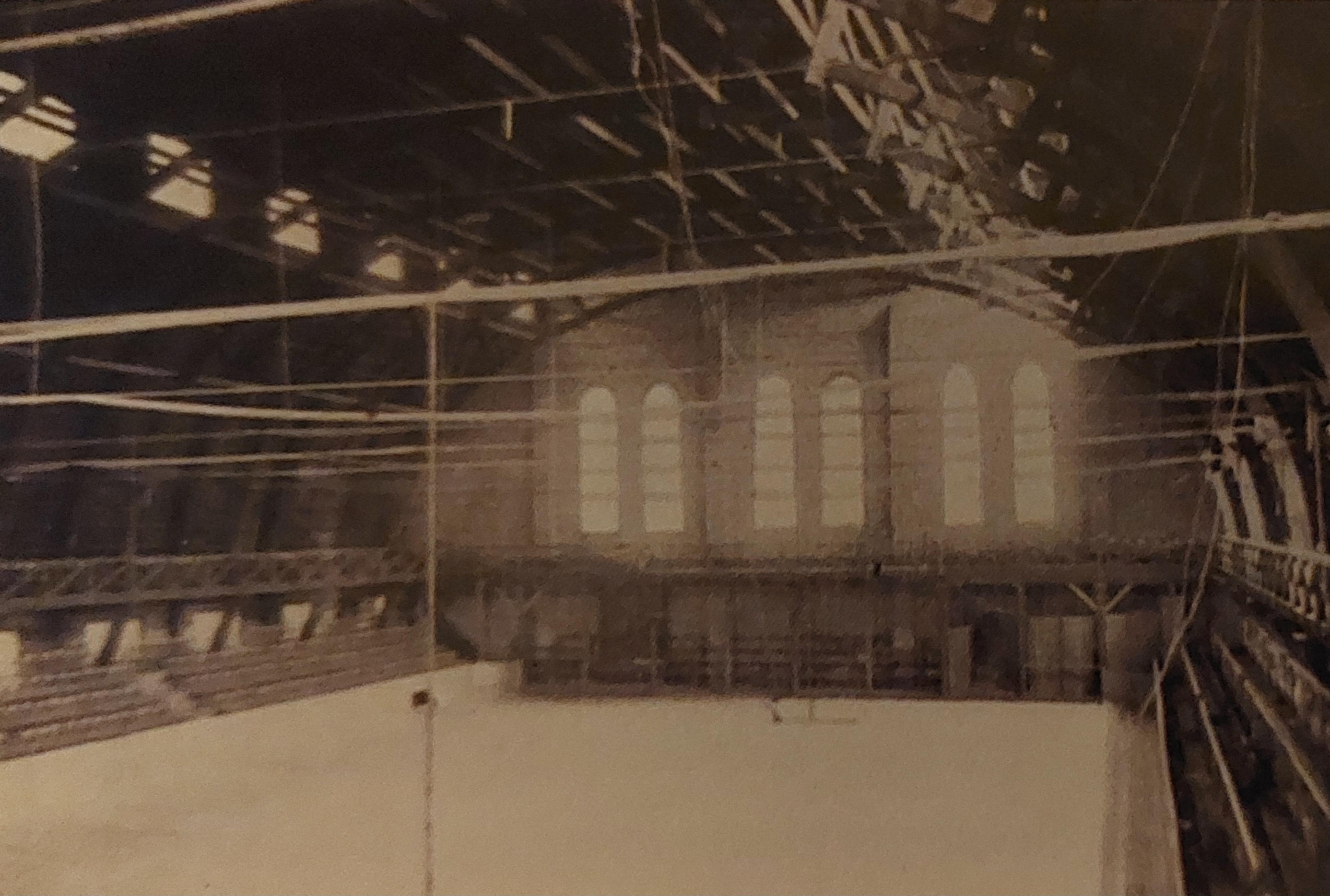
Interior

Opening announcement
