= Vancouver Lacrosse Club =

Canadian professional field lacrosse team

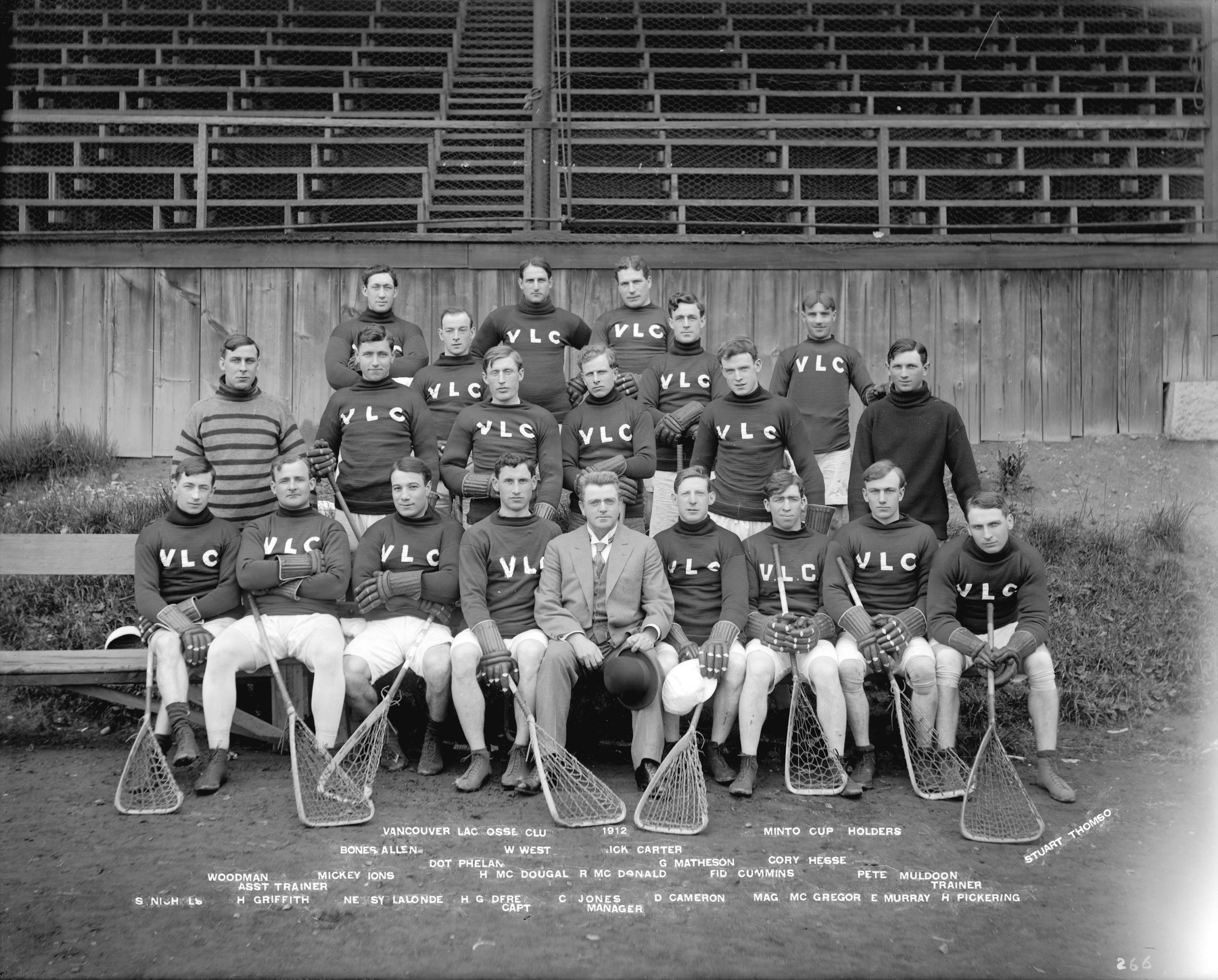
- Vancouver Lacrosse Club in 1912
- Sport: Lacrosse
- Founded: 1909
- Folded: 1924
- Based in: Vancouver, British Columbia, Canada
- Arena: Con Jones Park
- Owner: Con Jones
- Manager: Con Jones

The Vancouver Lacrosse Club was a Canadian professional field lacrosse team in Vancouver, British Columbia during the 1910s and the 1920s. The team was managed by sports promoter Con Jones and played at the Con Jones Park (later renamed Callister Park) in Vancouver.

The team won the Minto Cup in 1911.

== Players ==
One of the stars on the team was Edouard "Newsy" Lalonde, lured over by Con Jones to play for the team in 1911. Lalonde was also a big star in ice hockey, and the Vancouver Lacrosse Club also saw other players overlap between the two sports. Ice hockey star Cyclone Taylor played briefly for the club in 1913, and Mickey Ion, referee-in-chief of the professional Pacific Coast Hockey Association, also played on the Vancouver Lacrosse Club.
