= Con Jones =

Australian-born Canadian businessman and sports promoter

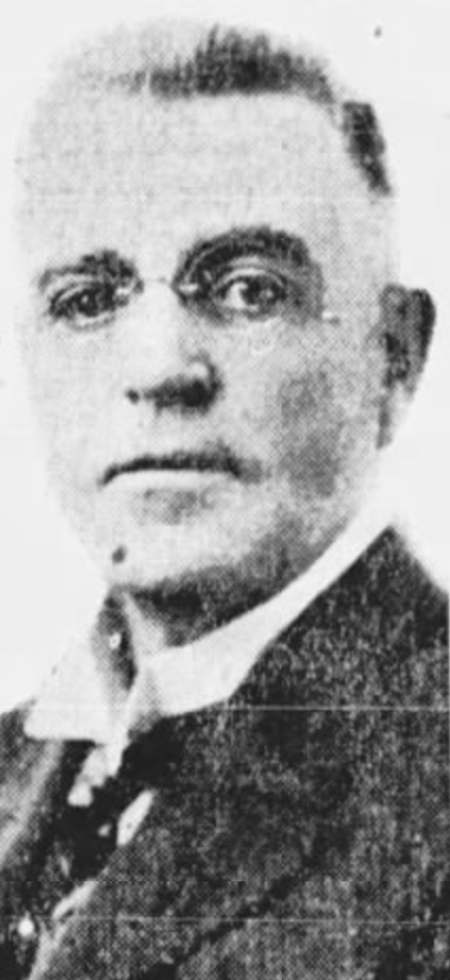
- Born: Con Jones; August 18, 1869; Sydney, New South Wales, Australia
- Died: June 3, 1929 (aged 59); Vancouver, British Columbia, Canada
- Occupation(s): businessman, sports promoter

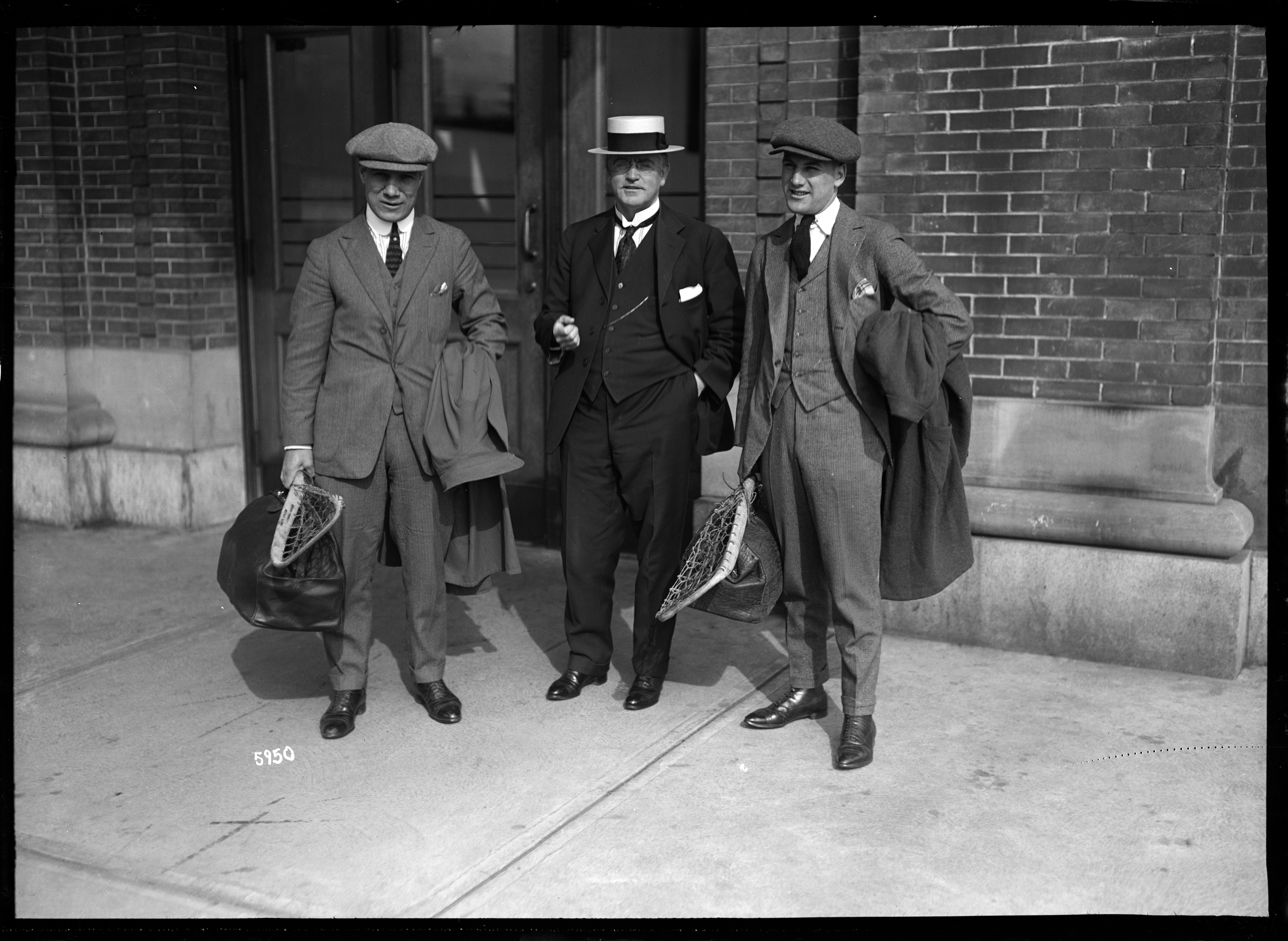
Jones, at center, with lacrosse players Newsy Lalonde and Léo Dandurand.

Con Jones (August 18, 1869 – June 3, 1929), birth name Thomas Shortel, was an Australian-born Canadian businessman and sports promoter, primarily active as a sports promoter in British Columbia during the 1910s and 1920s.

He was inducted into the Canadian Lacrosse Hall of Fame in 1965.

== Biography ==
Originally from the Woollahra area of Sydney in New South Wales, Jones arrived in Vancouver in November 1903 and first earned his living as a tobacconist.

Later on, during the 1910s and 1920s, Jones became one of the most prominent sports promoters in Western Canada, promoting field lacrosse and soccer in the Vancouver area. His teams played at the Con Jones Park (later renamed Callister Park) in Vancouver. In 1911 Jones made a big splash when he lured over lacrosse star Newsy Lalonde to sign with the Vancouver Lacrosse Club.

Jones died in Vancouver in 1929 and is buried at the Ocean View Burial Park in Burnaby, British Columbia.
