= Callister Park =

Park in Vancouver, Canada

Con Jones Park (1921–1942) Callister Park (1942–1970)
- Interactive map of Con Jones Park (1921–1942); Callister Park (1942–1970)
- Location: Renfrew Street, Vancouver, Canada
- Coordinates: 49°17′10″N 123°02′43″W
- Owner: Con Jones (1921–1942); Ada Stevenson (1942); Pacific National Exhibition (1942–1970).
- Capacity: 5,000 est.
- Surface: Natural Grass/Dirt

Construction
- Opened: 1921
- Demolished: Feb. 4, 1971

Tenants
- Soccer: Pacific Coast Soccer League; Baseball: Vancouver Maple Leafs (Western International League) 1937–1938.

Con Jones Park was a sports facility located in East Vancouver, British Columbia, Canada, that was mainly used for soccer. It opened in 1921, and was renamed Callister Park in 1942. After the demolition of the stadium in 1971, the area was redeveloped into a green space and retained the name Callister Park.

== Background ==
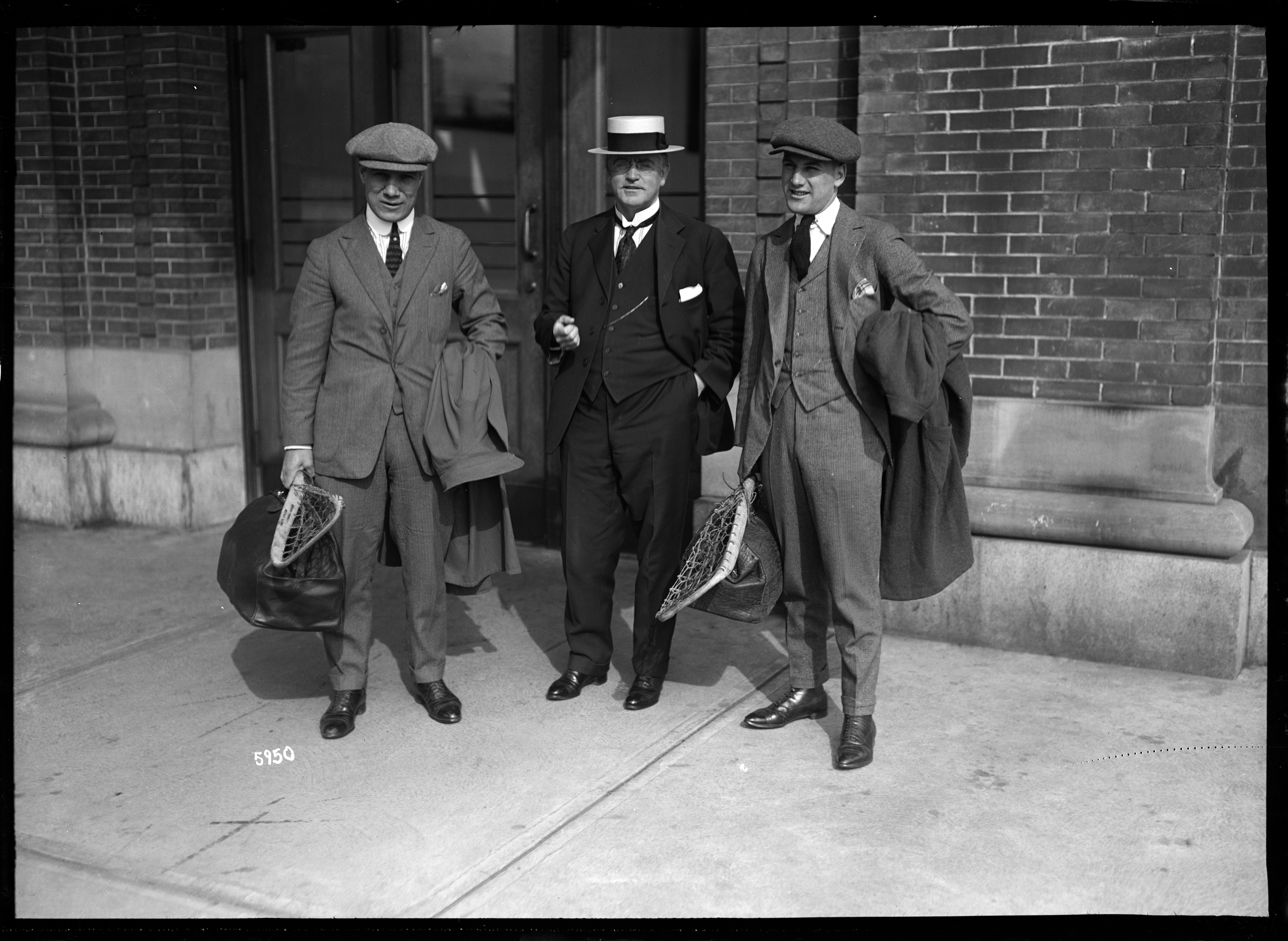
Con Jones (centre) with Léo Dandurand (right) and Newsy Lalonde (left) in 1912.

In April 1885 builder and contractor John Callister arrived in Vancouver from the Isle of Man. Callister was a pioneer who built his home in a forested area covering about three blocks in 1904. Upon his death Callister, a bachelor, left his property to two nieces. One of the sisters died, and Mrs. Ada M. Stevenson inherited all of the property.

On September 18, 1920, sports promoter Con Jones entered into an agreement to purchase "lot 5, Town of Hastings, Suburban Lands" for $10,000 from Stevenson. According to the Vancouver city archives only three payments of $1,000 were made. In the space of a year, Jones supervised the building of a grandstand and field and Con Jones Park opened in 1921.

The park was destroyed by fire in June, 1934. Con Jones had died in 1929, but his sons rebuilt the stadium within weeks.

Media reports stated that due to Jones' default on payment, Stevenson seized the property and offered to present the land to the city. While many focus on the lack of mortgage payments, it appears to be several years of unpaid city taxes that forced the issue. Both of Jones' sons had died, which brought this to light. The land reverted to the Callister estate, and Stevenson donated it to the city in lieu of paying the taxes on it.

On March 20, 1942, Mrs. Stevenson entered into an agreement with the city to present the area for "municipal purposes". The bequest further stated that this expression..."be deemed to include exhibition, recreation or park purposes and the carrying on of public sports."

With the opening of Empire Stadium in 1954, many of the touring soccer teams from the United Kingdom shifted their friendlies to the much larger and more modern facility which was only a five minute walk away on the opposite side of the PNE grounds.

== Soccer ==
From 1939 to 1970, the Pacific Coast League was one of the primary attractions at Callister Park. League matches were played at the stadium until January 1942, then again for every Pacific Coast League season from 1945–46 to 1969–70.

=== British touring soccer ===
From the time the PNE took possession of Callister Park – until the opening of Empire Stadium in 1954 – with soccer as its principal tenant Callister Park made money. The annual friendlies featuring touring British soccer teams playing against local all-star squads were the most profitable.

In 1921 Third Lanark played two games in Vancouver; one at Con Jones Park and the other at Brockton Oval at Stanley Park.

Newcastle United visited on June 4, 1949 and played the BC All-Stars in front of an overflow crowd of 9,800. The game was played a week after a rodeo was staged on the grounds, prompting Newcastle manager George Martin to describe Callister as, "...a disgrace to football". Rangers were the final big name team to play at Callister in 1954.

== Baseball ==
The Vancouver Maple Leafs brought professional baseball back to the city for the first time in 15 years in a 5-4 loss to the Tacoma Tigers before 1,500 fans in April 1937. The Western International League would leave Con Jones Park at the end of the 1938 season as Jones sold the team to Seattle beer baron Emil Sick. Sick renamed the team the Vancouver Capilanos (after his brewery) and moved the team crosstown to Athletic Park for the 1939 season.

== Other sports ==
There were sports other than soccer played at the facility. Field Lacrosse was popular in the Intercity Lacrosse League during the 1920s and 1930s. Rodeos, demolition derby and rugby union were also staged there from time-to-time, although in the case of rugby, Brockton Oval, Vancouver's Athletic Park and UBC's Varsity Stadium (Vancouver) were the standard facilities for the game.
