= Mickey Ion =

Canadian lacrosse player and ice hockey referee

- Hockey Hall of Fame, 1961 (Official)
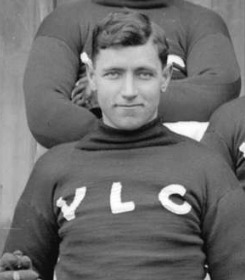
- Ion with the Vancouver Lacrosse Club in 1912.
- Born: February 25, 1886 Paris, Ontario, Canada
- Died: October 26, 1964 (aged 78) Seattle, Washington, United States
- Playing career: 1909–1942

Frederick James "Mickey" Ion (February 25, 1886 – October 26, 1964) was a Canadian professional lacrosse player and ice hockey referee. He was referee-in-chief of the Pacific Coast Hockey Association (PCHA) and later the referee-in-chief of the National Hockey League (NHL). He is an Honoured Member of the Hockey Hall of Fame.

== History ==
A professional lacrosse player with the Toronto Tecumsehs in 1909, Ion signed with the Vancouver Lacrosse Club team in 1911. The team was run by hockey entrepreneurs Lester Patrick and Frank Patrick, and when they started the Pacific Coast Hockey Association in 1911, they hired several of their lacrosse players—Ion among them—to referee the league's games.

Ion quickly became the league's chief referee. He was well known as being an iron man, officiating as many as four or five games in a week throughout western Canada.

Ion joined the Western Canada Hockey League as senior official when the PCHA folded in 1924, and the National Hockey League in 1926 when the western loop folded as well. He was later named referee-in-chief of the NHL, a position he held until 1942.

He was elected to the Hockey Hall of Fame—one of the first three referees to be so honoured—in 1961.

=== All-Star Team ===
Among his innovations was the first known season-ending All-Star team, the naming of which was a regular practice of his from then on and which received much publicity each year. His first such selection, in the 1913–14 PCHA season, had Hugh Lehman of New Westminster in goal, Ernie Johnson of New Westminster and Frank Patrick of Vancouver on defence, Cyclone Taylor of Vancouver as the rover, and Tom Dunderdale of Victoria, Eddie Oatman of New Westminster and Dubbie Kerr of Victoria at forward.

== Lacrosse career ==
Ion was primarily a defensive player in the 'cover point' and three 'defense' positions with a decent knack for goals-scoring—an unusual occurrence back in those days. He played with Toronto Tecumsehs in 1909 and came out west with the team in its Minto Cup challenge. He then moved west in 1911 when the Vancouver Lacrosse Club team in the professional BCLA league signed him. He played three seasons with Vancouver but then signed with the New Westminster Salmonbellies for the 1914 season. He would return to Vancouver for the 1915 season. Ion played one more season of professional field lacrosse in British Columbia with Vancouver in 1919. He then became the chief referee in the professional league for the 1921 season.

=== Jail sentence ===
Ion was handed a 10-day jail sentence on October 30, 1909, in front of Judge Winchester in Toronto, for kicking fellow lacrosse player George Kalls in the face during a lacrosse game between the Tecumsehs and the Torontos on Civic Holiday (August 2) 1909. Toronto Tecumseh captain Charles Querrie, along with a big group of other lacrosse men, attended the court when Ion was handed his verdict.
