= Newsy Lalonde =

Canadian ice hockey and lacrosse player (1887–1970)

- Hockey Hall of Fame, 1950
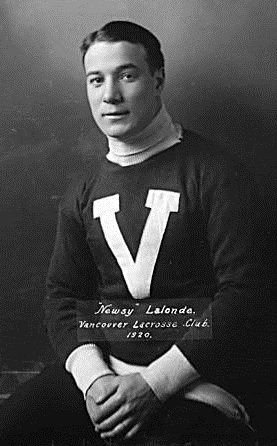
- Lalonde with Vancouver Lacrosse Club in 1920
- Born: October 31, 1887 Cornwall, Ontario, Canada
- Died: November 21, 1970 (aged 83) Montreal, Quebec, Canada
- Height: 5 ft 9 in (175 cm)
- Weight: 168 lb (76 kg; 12 st 0 lb)
- Position: Centre / Defence
- Shot: Right
- Played for: Montreal Canadiens; Renfrew Creamery Kings; Vancouver Millionaires; Saskatoon Sheiks; New York Americans
- Playing career: 1904–1927

Édouard Cyrille "Newsy" Lalonde (October 31, 1887 – November 21, 1970) was a Canadian professional ice hockey forward in the National Hockey League (NHL) and a professional lacrosse player. Lalonde is regarded as one of hockey's and lacrosse's greatest players of the first half of the 20th century and one of Canadian sport's most colourful characters. He played for the Montreal Canadiens – considered to be the original "Flying Frenchman" – in the National Hockey Association and the NHL. As player-coach, Lalonde led the Canadiens to their first Stanley Cup in 1916. His goal-scoring prowess in the 1919 Stanley Cup playoffs set three NHL records that remain unbroken over a century later. He also played for the WCHL's Saskatoon Sheiks.

== Early life and family ==
Lalonde was born to Pierre Lalonde (1847 – 1926) and Rose Lalonde (1849 – 1939). As a minor, he worked as, first, a reporter, then as a printer, for the Cornwall Freeholder and Woodstock, Ontario Express newspapers, where he acquired the "Newsy" moniker.

On May 7, 1913, Lalonde married Iona Elizabeth Letters (1899 – 1966), daughter of James Harcourt and Sarah Job. The couple had two children.

== Early ice hockey career ==
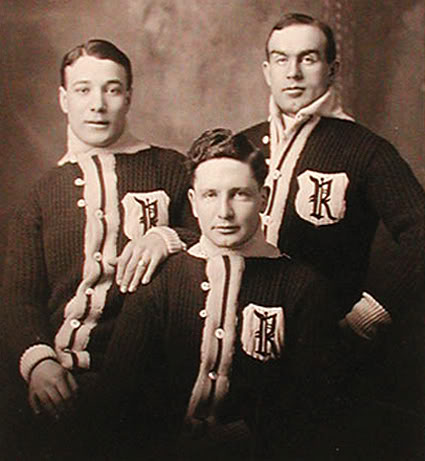
Lalonde (left) with Renfrew Creamery Kings teammates Frank Patrick and Cyclone Taylor.

In 1904, Lalonde started his career with the Cornwall Victorias of the Federal Amateur Hockey League (FAHL). The next season, he played for the Woodstock club of the Ontario Hockey Association Senior A League. Lalonde made the trek to Sault Ste. Marie, Ontario in 1906 to play in the International Professional Hockey League, hockey's first known professional league. In his one season in the Sault, he was named to the IHL Second All-Star Team. In 1907, Lalonde signed with the Toronto Professionals of the Ontario Professional Hockey League, and with line mates Bruce Ridpath and Wally Mercer led the "Torontos" to the league championship, losing the Cup in a close match with the Montreal Wanderers in which Lalonde scored twice.

The year 1910 saw the foundation of the National Hockey Association (NHA), precursor to the NHL, and Lalonde joined the Montreal Canadiens for their first season. Lalonde scored the first goal for the Montreal Canadiens. Halfway through the season, the Habs traded him to the Renfrew Creamery Kings, for whom Lalonde led the league in scoring. He rejoined the Canadiens for the 1911 season—professional hockey was only then developing any sense of teams retaining the rights to their players—during which he had several stick battles and provoked the ire of opposing fans.

With the formation of the Pacific Coast Hockey Association (PCHA) in 1912, Lalonde jumped to the Vancouver Millionaires, and promptly led the league in scoring its inaugural year. Vancouver traded him back to Montreal the following season for Didier Pitre. In 1915, Lalonde held out in contract negotiations, only playing six games, but aside from that, he remained with the Canadiens for the next ten years, winning the NHA scoring title again in 1916 and captaining the Canadiens to his only Stanley Cup victory. Despite his holdout, he was named player-coach of the Canadiens in 1915.

== NHL/WCHL career ==
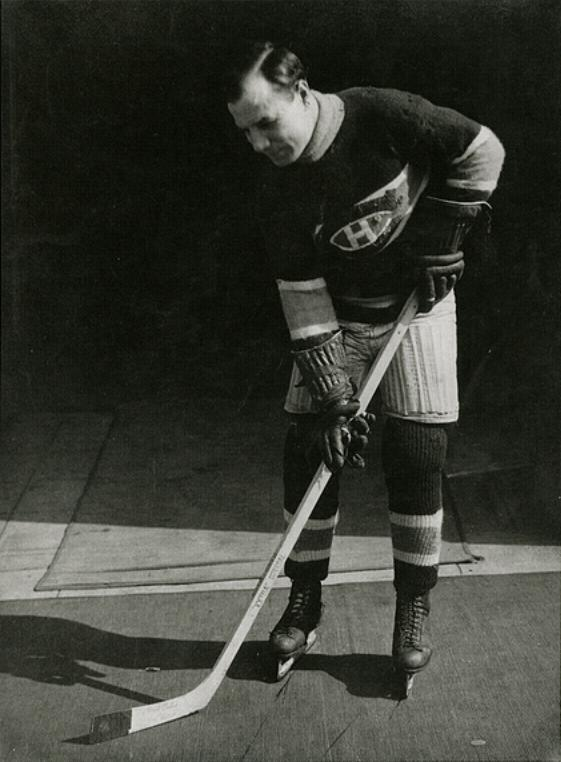
Lalonde with the Montreal Canadiens.

Newsy Lalonde played (and scored) in the first NHL game on December 19, 1917, when the Montreal Canadiens defeated the Ottawa Senators, 7–4. He would score in each of the first six NHL games, a mark that would stand unchallenged for the rest of the century.

During the 1919 Stanley Cup playoffs, Lalonde scored seventeen goals in ten games. However, on the day of the sixth game of the finals against the Seattle Metropolitans, Lalonde, owner George Kennedy, Joe Hall, Billy Coutu, Jack McDonald and Louis Berlinguette were hospitalized with influenza, in the wave of the 1918 flu pandemic. Five and a half hours before its start, the game was postponed. With his entire team either hospitalized or confined to bed, Kennedy announced he was forfeiting the game—and the Cup—to the Metropolitans. However, the Metropolitans felt it would be unsporting to accept the trophy under the circumstances, and the sixth game was never played. Hall did not survive.

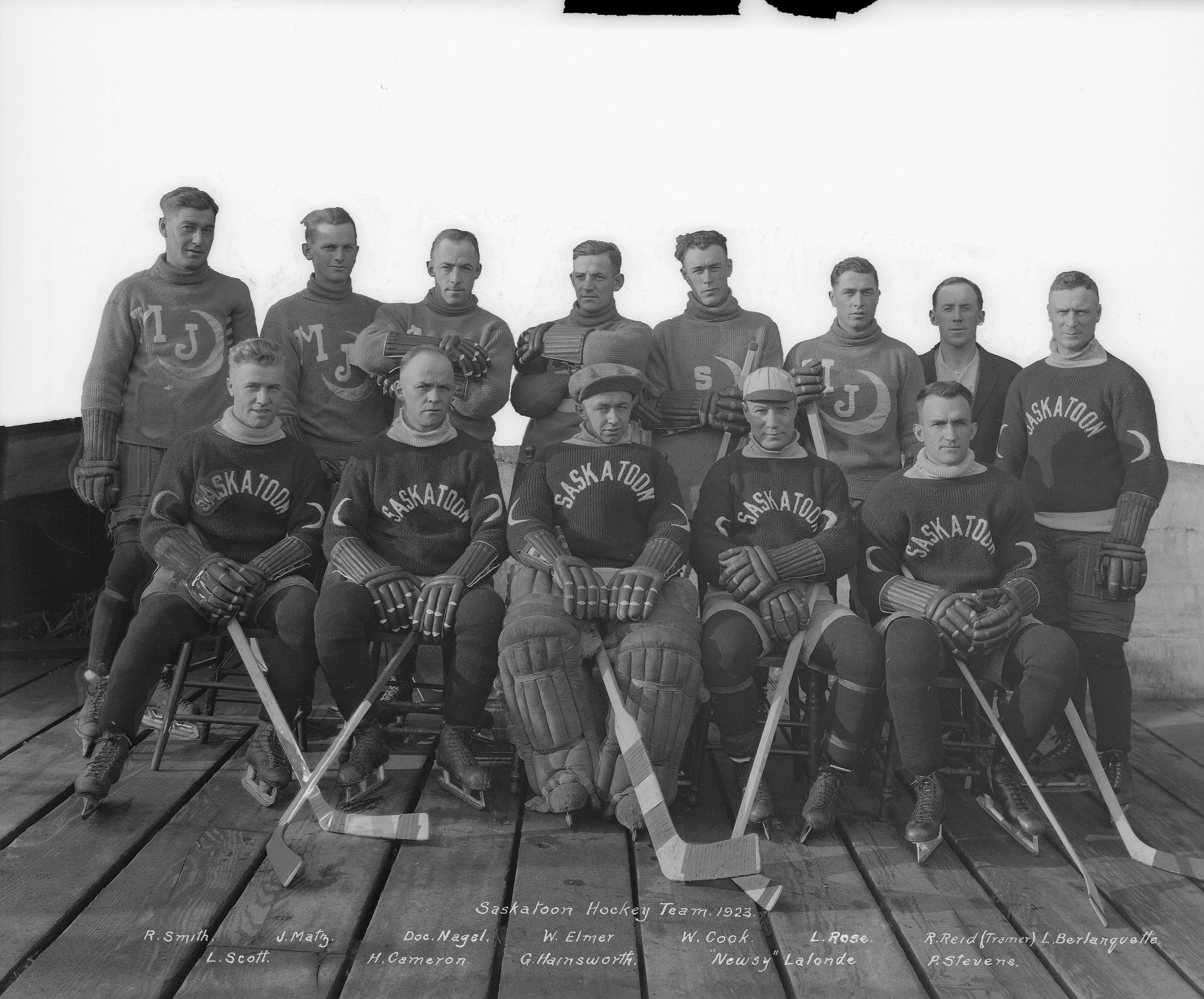
Lalonde, sitting second from right, with the Saskatoon Crescents in 1923–24.

Thereafter Lalonde had two fine years, but after the Kennedy estate sold the Canadiens to Leo Dandurand, his clashes with the new ownership affected his play to the point where he left the team for four games, and he was relegated to reserve duty amidst the boos of the fans. Saskatoon Crescents' manager Frederick E. Betts sought to sign Lalonde as the team's player-coach for the season, and was willing to buy Lalonde's release pending all other National Hockey League clubs waiving their right to claim Lalonde. Dandurand and Betts later agreed to trade the rights to highly-touted prospect Aurèle Joliat to bring Lalonde to the Crescents. (When Lalonde and Joliat met later that season, Lalonde, unhappy that Joliat was fast becoming a fan favorite in Montreal, got his "revenge" by serving Joliat with a vicious crosscheck to the face).

On a line with future Hall of Famer Bill Cook, Lalonde achieved his final scoring title as playing coach of the Sheiks, although the team had a poor overall record. The next two seasons the team was much improved, but Lalonde himself was finally feeling his age and was no longer an impact player. He scored the final goal of his career on March 2, 1925, against Vancouver. The following season he played three regular season games and two playoff games, the last for the Saskatoon franchise before the Western Hockey League folded.

The following season, 1927, Lalonde was named the head coach of the New York Americans. He played as a substitute for one final game in November 1926 before hanging up his skates permanently. After his retirement, he also served as the head coach of the Ottawa Senators between 1929 and 1931, and of the Canadiens between 1932 and 1935.

== Lacrosse career ==
Although Lalonde is best-remembered today as a hockey player, he was just as prominent in lacrosse, which in the early years of the 20th century was one of the most popular professional sports in Canada. Lalonde earned more in lacrosse than he did in hockey. He started play in 1905 as a goaltender, but moved to the attack position in 1910, becoming the sport's greatest star. He would break the scoring record for his Montreal team in 1910 with 31 goals. In 1912, he was signed to be player-manager of the Toronto Lacrosse Club, but almost immediately changed his mind and joined the exodus of players heading west for big contracts. He was signed by Con Jones to play for Vancouver for $5,000 for one season. In comparison, as a hockey player, his salary in 1910–11 for the Montreal Canadiens was $1,300, which was considered high for the time. As late as 1920 he could not get more than $2,000 a year playing hockey. Lalonde scored an incredible 66 goals for the Montreal Nationals in 1914.

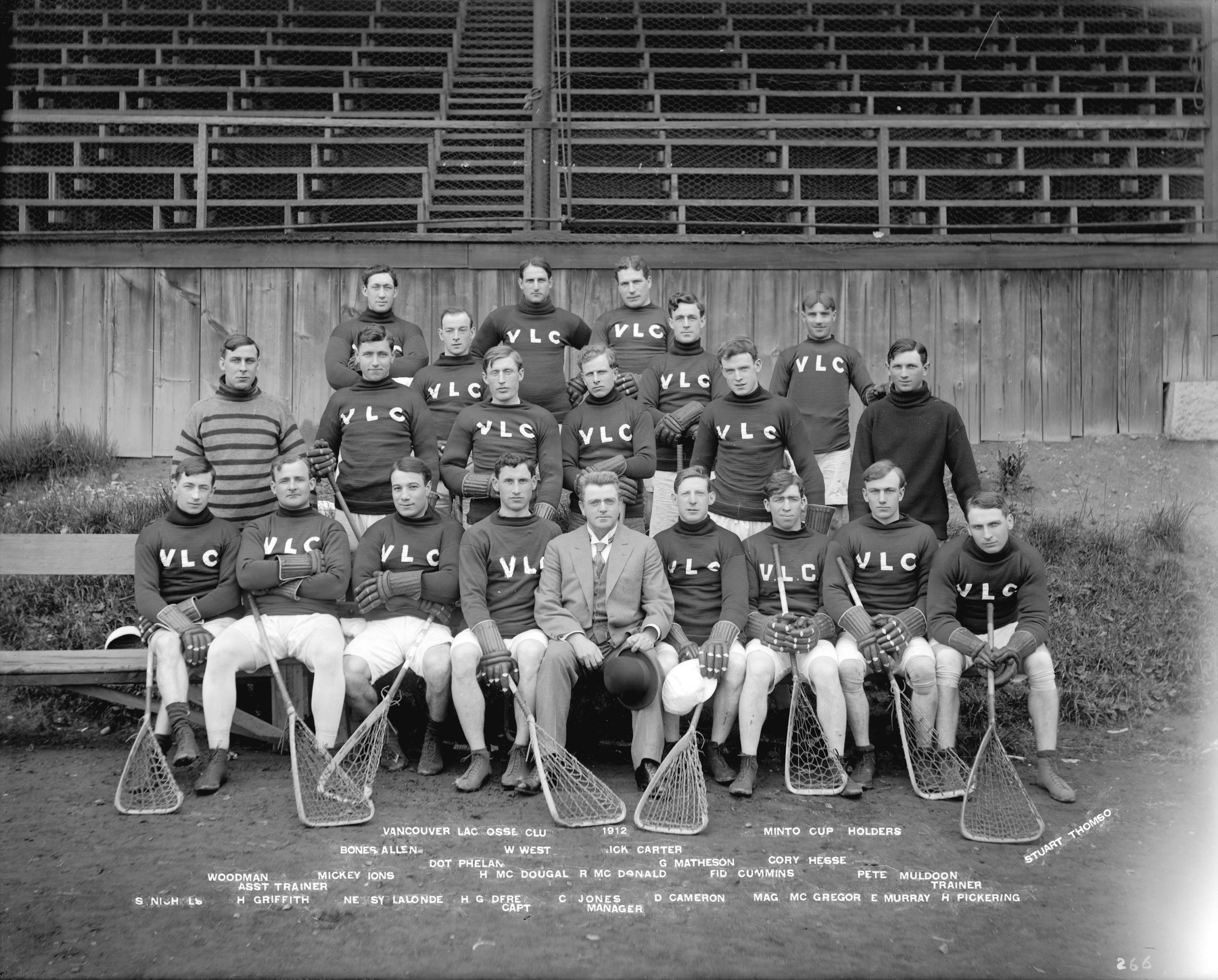
Lalonde, third from left in the front row, with the Vancouver Lacrosse Club in 1912.

After coming west in 1909 as a hired-hand with the Regina Capitals to compete against the New Westminster Salmonbellies in their challenge for the Minto Cup, playing as a defenceman, Lalonde then decided to remain in British Columbia when Vancouver Lacrosse Club president Con Jones offered him a contract. This was more than double what he was earning with the Montréal Nationals the previous season. To compete against the New Westminster Salmonbellies, Con Jones bought Newsy Lalonde.

Lalonde would pay off Jones by helping lead Vancouver to three Minto Cup pro championships – in 1911, 1918, and 1920. He played what was then called the inside home position – an attacking forward who played on the crease as the primary threat against the opposing goaltender – and his goal-scoring prowess was critically important to the success of his Vancouver team as Lalonde constantly went up against skilled New Westminster goaltenders of the day, such as Alex "Sandy" Gray and then later the legendary Alban "Bun" Clark.

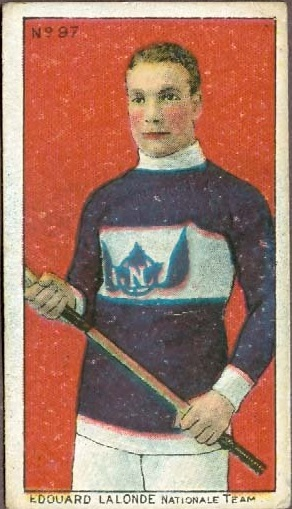
Lalonde with Montreal Nationals lacrosse team.

During his nine seasons spent playing for the Vancouver Lacrosse Club and Vancouver Terminals, Lalonde finished 11th in overall career games played (2nd with the Vancouver club) and 3rd overall in career goal-scoring with 147 goals in 93 games.

However, what is more impressive is in five of those nine seasons with Vancouver, he led the league in goal-scoring (and in 1911, also in penalties). During a ten-season period from 1910 through 1918, and regardless whether he was playing out west in the professional British Columbia Lacrosse Association with Vancouver or back east in the National Lacrosse Union or Dominion Lacrosse Union with the Montréal Nationals, Lalonde would lead the respective league for goals in all seasons but one.

In an era when lacrosse was notably rough and tumble and players wore no padding, all the while swinging wooden sticks, Lalonde was one never to back down from the toughness aspect of the game. His favourite tactic was to crowd his check and bull his way through opposition. Along with all his goals, the competitive Lalonde also amassed 45 penalties and 356 penalty minutes during his career on the West Coast.

In 1950, he was selected by a panel of Canadian sports journalists as the greatest lacrosse player of the first half of the 20th century. He received an impressive 13 votes compared to his next two challengers, Billy Fitzgerald (6 votes) and Henry Hoobin (5 votes).

As a fitting, final tribute to his career, Lalonde was an obvious choice for the initial inductees to the Canadian Lacrosse Hall of Fame in 1965 in the "field player" category.

== Legacy and playing style ==
"It’s very simple. All that is necessary is to keep the puck away from him."

— Lester Patrick jokingly describes the only way to prevent Lalonde from scoring

A leading scorer for the Canadiens in six years, Lalonde served as captain from 1915 to 1921. He was a member of the first Montreal Canadiens team to win the Stanley Cup in 1916. He was scoring champion seven times in the National Hockey Association, Pacific Coast Hockey Association, National Hockey League and Western Hockey League, an unprecedented feat in the major professional ranks and unsurpassed until Wayne Gretzky's tenth scoring title in 1994. From 1910 to 1954, he held the record for the most regular-season goals scored by a major league hockey player, including his pre-NHL and WCHL totals — 468 goals, a record later broken by Maurice Richard.

Much of Lalonde's production came from his highly accurate snap shot, and his remarkable longevity which allowed him to play a physically aggressive style for upwards of 23 seasons. Lester Patrick, co-founder of the PCHA and then-captain of the Victoria Aristocrats, claimed in 1912 that Lalonde possessed the best shot in hockey: “He shoots every bit as hard as Pitre, and is much more deadly." Up until 1918, Lalonde cleverly used a specific rule of hockey – which stipulated that goaltenders could not drop to their knees to block shots – to complement his superb accuracy. Coming off the right wing or down the centre, he would unleash a “wicked knee-high shot” which would catch the opposing goalie between the glove – or stick – and pad. This shot placement was deliberately done in order to slow down a goalie's reaction time; they were often unable to decide between using their glove hand or blocker hand to deflect or catch the puck, and shuffling to one side or the other to use their pads. Lalonde's snapper was so lethal that opposing coaches would often assign three to four of their own players just to shadow him, and – in one of the earliest iterations of the trap – attempt to pin him into a corner in order to prevent his being able to get into a scoring position. Where Lalonde lacked somewhat was in the speed department, but he made up for it with his head, always thinking ahead of the plays.

"Why, Hall always starts chewing the rag the minute he sees my face on the ice. I never speak to him until he gets shouting at me half a dozen times and keeps telling me I won't finish the game. Then of course I've got to start something."

— Lalonde on his on-ice feud with Joe Hall.

On a more personal level, he was said to have been one of the meanest players of his time, hated by opposition players and even by some of his teammates. As a coach, he once punched one of his players who tried to stand up to him, as a warning to the team that he would not take any back-talk. Before Joe Hall became a teammate of Lalonde on the Montreal Canadiens in 1917–18, when Hall was still a member of the rivaling Quebec Bulldogs in the NHA, the two players had an on-ice feud with each other that lasted over several seasons, often resulting in violent blows between the two players and subsequent stitches to sew up head wounds. Lalonde claimed that the violence was most often provoked by Hall taunting him verbally.

In 1950, Lalonde was named athlete of the half century in lacrosse. He was also elected to the Hockey Hall of Fame in 1950, the Canadian Lacrosse Hall of Fame in 1965, and the Sports Hall of Fame of Canada. He had lit the torch when the Sports Hall of Fame opened in Toronto in August 1955.

In 1998 he was ranked number 32 on The Hockey News' list of the 100 Greatest Hockey Players, making him the highest-ranking player on the list who had played in a professional league before the founding of the NHL.

Lalonde has the 3rd best points per game total in NHL history at 1.667, trailing only Mario Lemieux and Wayne Gretzky.

== Career statistics ==
=== Ice hockey regular season and playoffs ===
			Regular season					Playoffs
Season	Team	League	GP	G	A	Pts	PIM	GP	G	A	Pts	PIM
1904–05	Cornwall Athletic	OHA Jr.	—	—	—	—	—	—	—	—	—	—
1904–05	Cornwall HC	FAHL	2	1	0	1	—	—	—	—	—	—
1905–06	Woodstock Seniors	OHA Sr.	7	8	0	8	—	—	—	—	—	—
1906–07	Canadian Soo	IHL	18	29	4	33	27	—	—	—	—	—
1906–07	Cobalt Silver Kings	TPHL	—	—	—	—	—	—	—	—	—	—
1907–08	Portage la Prairie Cities	MPHL	1	0	0	0	0	—	—	—	—	—
1907–08	Toronto Professionals	OPHL	9	32	0	32	37	—	—	—	—	—
1907–08	Toronto Professionals	St-Cup	—	—	—	—	—	1	2	0	2	0
1907–08	Haileybury Comets	TPHL	—	—	—	—	—	1	3	0	3	0
1908–09	Toronto Professionals	OPHL	11	29	0	29	79	—	—	—	—	—
1908–09	Montreal Nationals	Exhib	1	5	0	5	0	—	—	—	—	—
1909–10	Montreal Canadiens	Exhib	1	2	0	2	3	—	—	—	—	—
1909–10	Montreal Canadiens	NHA	6	16	0	16	40	—	—	—	—	—
1909–10	Renfrew Creamery Kings	NHA	5	22	0	22	16	—	—	—	—	—
1910–11	Montreal Canadiens	NHA	16	19	0	19	63	—	—	—	—	—
1911–12	Vancouver Millionaires	PCHA	15	27	0	27	51	—	—	—	—	—
1911–12	PCHA All-Stars	Exhib	3	5	0	5	11	—	—	—	—	—
1912–13	Montreal Canadiens	NHA	18	25	0	25	61	—	—	—	—	—
1913–14	Montreal Canadiens	NHA	14	22	5	27	23	1	0	0	0	2
1914–15	Montreal Canadiens	NHA	7	4	3	7	17	—	—	—	—	—
1915–16	Montreal Canadiens	NHA	24	28	6	34	78	—	—	—	—	—
1915–16	Montreal Canadiens	St-Cup	—	—	—	—	—	4	3	0	3	41
1916–17	Montreal Canadiens	NHA	18	28	7	35	61	1	1	0	1	23
1916–17	Montreal Canadiens	St-Cup	—	—	—	—	—	4	1	0	1	24
1917–18	Montreal Canadiens	NHL	14	23	7	30	16	2	4	2	6	17
1918–19	Montreal Canadiens	NHL	17	22	10	32	40	5	11	2	13	15
1918–19	Montreal Canadiens	St-Cup	—	—	—	—	—	5	6	0	6	3
1919–20	Montreal Canadiens	NHL	23	37	9	46	34	—	—	—	—	—
1920–21	Montreal Canadiens	NHL	24	33	10	43	36	—	—	—	—	—
1921–22	Montreal Canadiens	NHL	20	9	5	14	20	—	—	—	—	—
1922–23	Saskatoon Crescents	WCHL	29	30	4	34	44	—	—	—	—	—
1923–24	Saskatoon Crescents	WCHL	21	10	10	20	24	—	—	—	—	—
1924–25	Saskatoon Sheiks	WCHL	22	8	6	14	42	2	0	0	0	4
1925–26	Saskatoon Sheiks	WHL	3	0	0	0	2	2	0	0	0	2
1926–27	New York Americans	NHL	1	0	0	0	2	—	—	—	—	—
1927–28	Quebec Beavers	Can-Am	1	0	0	0	0	—	—	—	—	—
NHA totals			108	164	22	185	359	2	1	0	1	25
PCHA totals			15	27	0	27	51	—	—	—	—	—
WCHL totals			75	48	20	68	112	4	0	0	0	6
NHL totals			99	124	41	165	138	7	15	4	19	32

=== Lacrosse ===
SEASON	TEAM	LEAGUE	GAMES	GOALS	ASSISTS	POINTS	PENALTIES	PIM	MINS	W	L	GA	GAA	WIN%
1905	Cornwall Colts	NLU	8	0	0	0	–	–	580	1	7	41	5.66	.125
1906	Cornwall Colts	NLU	14	0	0	0	–	–	1200	8	6	80	5.33	.571
1907	Cornwall Colts	NLU	11	0	0	0	–	–	940	8	3	63	5.36	.727
1908	Cornwall Colts	NLU	11	0	0	0	–	–	875	7	4	48	4.39	.636
1909	Regina Capitals	–	2	0	0	0	0	0						
1909	Vancouver Lacrosse Club	BCLA	10	25	–	25	6	48						
1910	Montréal Nationals	NLU	12	31	6	37	–	–						
1911	Vancouver Lacrosse Club	BCLA	14	16	–	16	13	97						
1912	Vancouver Lacrosse Club	BCLA	10	15	–	15	11	91						
1913	Vancouver Lacrosse Club	BCLA	7	16	–	16	2	10						
1914	Montréal Nationals	DLU	18	66	14	80	–	–						
1915	Montréal Nationals	NLU	12	36	9	45	–	–						
1916	Montréal Nationals	NLU	18	57	4	61	–	–						
1917	Montréal Nationals	NLU	4	22	9	31	–	–						
1918	Vancouver Greenshirts	MLA	7	23	–	23	1	5						
1918	Ottawa Capitals	NLU	1	3	0	3	1	–						
1918	Leaside Braves	CLA	1	1	0	1	–	–						
1919	did not play													
1920	Vancouver Terminals	BCLA	12	14	–	14	5	48						
1921	Vancouver Terminals	BCLA	17	18	–	18	5	53						
1922	Vancouver Terminals	BCLA	13	19	–	19	2	4						
1923	did not play													
1924	Vancouver Terminals	BCLA	3	1	1	2	0	0						
CAREER TOTALS			205	363	43	406	46	356	3595	24	20	232	5.27	.545

== Coaching record ==
=== National Hockey League ===
Team	Year	Regular season						Postseason
Team	Year	G	W	L	T	Pts	Division rank	Result
Montreal Canadiens	1917–18	22	13	9	0	26	1st in NHL	Lost O'Brien Trophy (7-10 vs. TOR)
Montreal Canadiens	1918–19	18	10	8	0	20	2nd in NHL	Won O'Brien Trophy (4-1 vs. OTT); Tied Stanley Cup (2-2-1 vs. SEA)
Montreal Canadiens	1919–20	24	13	11	0	26	2nd in NHL	Did not qualify
Montreal Canadiens	1920–21	24	13	11	0	26	3rd in NHL	Did not qualify
Montreal Canadiens	1921–22	7	2	5	0	4	4th in NHL	Resigned
New York Americans	1926–27	44	17	25	2	36	4th in Canadian	Did not qualify
Ottawa Senators	1929–30	44	21	15	8	50	3rd in Canadian	Lost league quarter-finals (3-6 vs. NYR)
Ottawa Senators	1930–31	44	10	30	4	24	5th in Canadian	Did not qualify
Montreal Canadiens	1932–33	48	18	25	5	41	3rd in Canadian	Lost in league quarter-finals (5-8 vs. NYR)
Montreal Canadiens	1933–34	48	22	20	6	50	2nd in Canadian	Lost in league quarter-finals (3-4 vs. CHI)
Montreal Canadiens	1934–35	16	5	8	3	13	4th in Canadian	Fired
NHL totals		339	144	167	28	316		7-7-4 (0.500)

=== Western Canada Hockey League ===
Team	Year	Regular season						Postseason
Team	Year	G	W	L	T	Pts	Division rank	Result
Saskatoon Crescents	1922–23	30	8	22	0	16	4th in WCHL	Did not qualify
Saskatoon Sheiks	1923–24	30	15	12	3	33	3rd in WCHL	Did not qualify
Saskatoon Sheiks	1924–25	28	16	11	1	33	2nd in WCHL	Lost league semi-finals (4-6 vs. VIC)
Saskatoon Sheiks	1925–26	30	18	11	1	37	2nd in WHL	Lost league semi-finals (3-4 vs. VIC)
WCHL totals		118	57	56	5	119		0-2-2 (0.250)

=== Canadian-American Hockey League ===
Team	Year	Regular season						Postseason
Team	Year	G	W	L	T	Pts	Division rank	Result
Quebec Castors	1927–28	40	18	14	8	44	3rd in CAHL	Won league semi-finals (4-2 vs. BOS); Lost Fontaine Cup finals (7-11 vs. SPR)
Providence Reds	1931–32	40	23	11	6	52	1st in CAHL	Won league semi-finals (5-2 vs. BNX); Won Fontaine Cup (3-0 vs. BOS)
CAHL totals		80	41	25	14	96		1 Fontaine Cup

=== Canadian Professional Hockey League ===
Team	Year	Regular season						Postseason
Team	Year	G	W	L	T	Pts	Division rank	Result
Niagara Falls Cataracts	1928–29	42	12	28	2	26	8th in CPHL	Did not qualify
CPHL totals		42	12	28	2	26		0-0 (0.000)

== Awards and achievements ==
=== Ice hockey ===
- Stanley Cup – 1916 (Montreal Canadiens)
- NHL scoring champion – 1918–19 & 1920–21

=== Lacrosse ===
- Minto Cup – 1911 (Vancouver Lacrosse Club), 1918 (Vancouver Greenshirts) & 1920 (Vancouver Terminals)

== NHL records ==
- Most goals, playoff game: 5 (tied with four other players) on March 1, 1919
- Most 4-goal games, playoff year: 2 (tied with Wayne Gretzky) in 1919
- Most goals, Stanley Cup Final game: 4 (tied with five other players) on March 22, 1919

== See also ==
- List of players with five or more goals in an NHL game

Sporting positions
Preceded by Jack Laviolette	Montreal Canadiens captain 1910–11	Succeeded by Jack Laviolette
Preceded by Jack Laviolette	Montreal Canadiens captain 1912–13	Succeeded by Jimmy Gardner
Preceded by Howard McNamara	Montreal Canadiens captain 1916–22	Succeeded by Sprague Cleghorn
Preceded by Jimmy Gardner	Head coach of the Montreal Canadiens; 1915–1921	Succeeded by Léo Dandurand
Preceded by Tommy Gorman	Head coach of the New York Americans; 1926–1927	Succeeded by Shorty Green
Preceded by Dave Gill	Head coach of the Ottawa Senators; 1929–1931	Succeeded by Cy Denneny
Preceded by Cecil Hart	Head coach of the Montreal Canadiens; 1932–1935	Succeeded by Sylvio Mantha
Awards and achievements
Preceded by Joe Malone	NHL Scoring Champion; 1921	Succeeded by Punch Broadbent
Preceded by Joe Malone	NHL Scoring Champion; 1919	Succeeded by Joe Malone
