= Toronto Professional Hockey Club =

Toronto Hockey Club
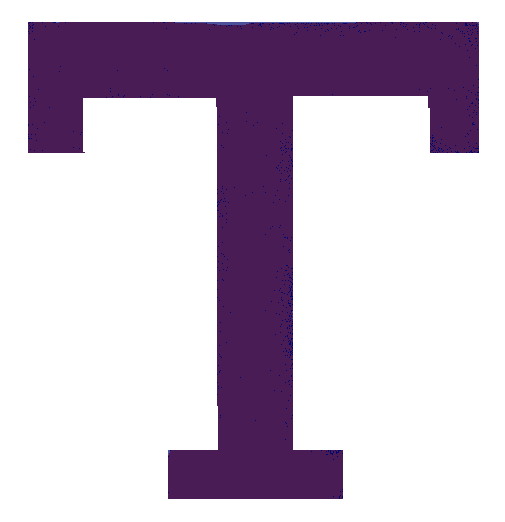
- City: Toronto, Ontario, Canada
- League: Ontario Professional Hockey League
- Founded: 1906; 120 years ago
- Folded: 1909; 117 years ago
- Home arena: Mutual Street Rink
- Colors: Blue
- Owner: Percy Quinn

Franchise history
- 1912–13 - 1916–17: Toronto Blueshirts

The Toronto Professional Hockey Club was a professional ice hockey team in Toronto, Ontario, Canada. It was Toronto's first professional ice hockey team, founded in 1906. The team played the 1906–07 season in exhibition games against other professional teams. In 1908, the team was one of the founders of the Ontario Professional Hockey League (OPHL). The club operated for two seasons in the OPHL, 1908 and 1909, before disbanding. The club was challenged unsuccessfully for the Stanley Cup in 1908. They were usually referred to as the Toronto Argonauts.

The team featured several prominent players of the time, including Newsy Lalonde who would be inducted into the Hockey Hall of Fame and Bruce Ridpath, who would manage the Toronto entry in the National Hockey Association (NHA), fore-runner of the National Hockey League (NHL).

== History ==
On November 14, 1906, the Ontario Hockey Association (OHA) banned Bruce Ridpath, Rolly Young and Harry Burgoyne from playing with the Toronto Marlboros. The three had been receiving money to play, which was strictly banned by the OHA. On November 22, Ridpath announced the formation of the Toronto Pros. Ridpath would be captain, and Alexander Miln was named as manager. Miln was manager of the Mutual Street Rink and had previously managed the Toronto Wellingtons, Stanley Cup challengers in 1902. On November 24, Miln attended a meeting of the International Hockey League (IHL) and secured a place in the IHL for the Pros for the 1907–08 season. For the initial season, the Toronto Pros would play only exhibition games.

=== 1906–07 season ===
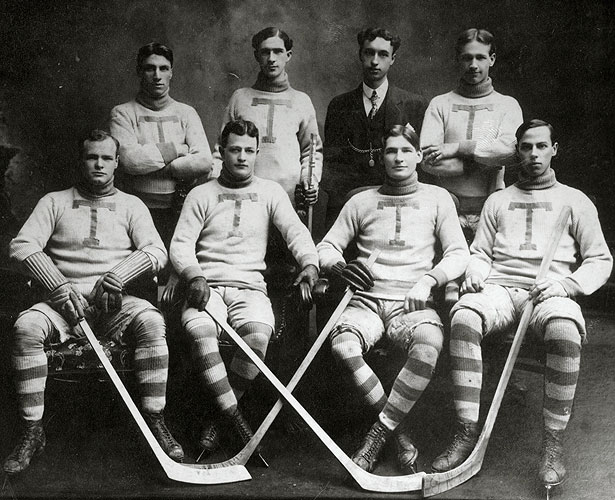
Toronto Professionals in the 1906–07 season. Back row: William Slean, Jack Carmichael, B. Spanner, team captain Bruce Ridpath. Front row: Rowley Young, Charlie Liffiton, Harry Burgoyne, Hugh Lambe.

Toronto would play its first game on December 28, 1906 against the Canadian Soo team of the IHL, losing 7–0 at the Mutual Street Rink in Toronto. The team did not receive its new white and purple sweaters in time for the game, and played the first game in used sweaters of the Marlboros.

First game roster

- Jack Carmichael, centre
- Harry Burgoyne, left wing
- Frank McLaren, right wing
- Bruce Ridpath, rover
- Rowley Young, cover point
- Hugh Lambe, point
- Mark Tooze, goaltender

Source: Harper 2013

=== 1907–08 season ===
The club helped found the Ontario Professional Hockey League in December 1907, beginning play in 1908. The team won the league championship in their first OPHL season. After the season, the Torontos would challenge for the Stanley Cup.

1908 Stanley Cup challenge

On March 14, 1908, the team played a Stanley Cup challenge match against the Montreal Wanderers in Montreal. The Wanderers won the game 6-4.

Stanley Cup challenge game roster

- Chuck Tyner (goal)
- Con Corbeau (point)
- Rowley Young (cover point)
- Bert Morrison (forward)
- Newsy Lalonde (forward)
- Bruce Ridpath (forward)
- Wally Mercer (forward)
- Jack Marks (sub)

=== 1908–09 season ===
The '08–09 season would be the Torontos' last. The team did not ice a consistent roster from game to game. A game against Berlin turned into a brawl. The team suffered player raids from the Temiscaming League. Con Corbeau and Skene Ronan joined Haileybury. Bruce Ridpath joined the Cobalt Silver Kings in February 1909. The team would finish the season in fourth place.

During the season they signed former Toronto Marlboros player Herb Birmingham as a spare forward, but cut from team due to poor playing. He would eventually join the army during World War I and died in France.

On November 19, 1909, manager Alexander Miln announced that the club was exiting from the OPHL. Miln noted that the Mutual Rink would be used only for amateurs' play for 1909–10.

== Notable players ==
- Newsy Lalonde - future Hall of Famer
- Jack Marks - three-time Stanley Cup champion with Quebec Bulldogs and Toronto Arenas and played in the NHL.
- Bruce Ridpath - Stanley Cup champion with Ottawa Senators, and would manage the Toronto Blueshirts.
