= Brantford Indians =

- City: Brantford, Ontario; Canada
- League: Ontario Professional Hockey League, 1907–1911
- Colours: Purple & White

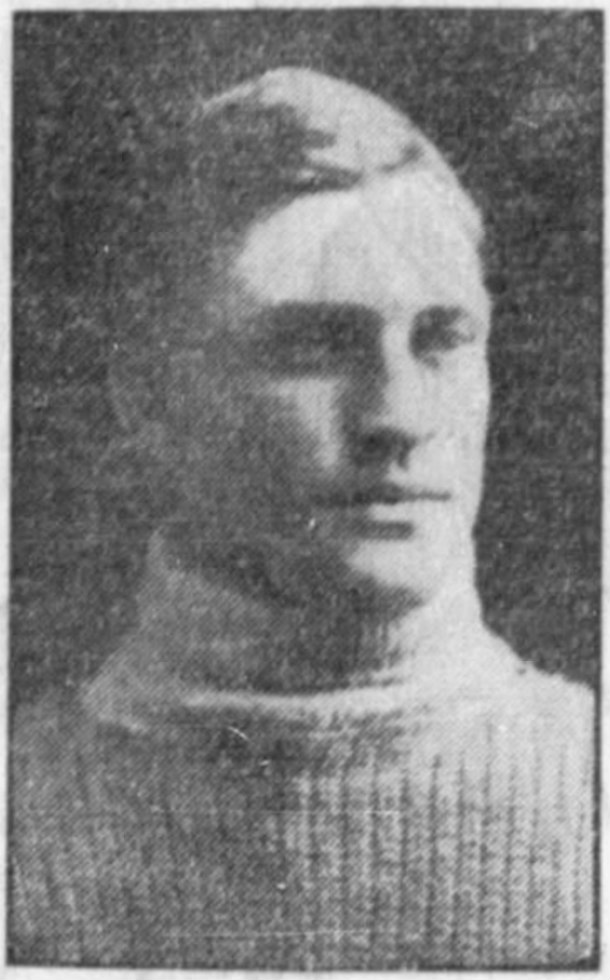
Brantford player Walter Miller in 1908–09.

The Brantford Indians were a professional ice hockey team from Brantford, Ontario in Canada. The team played for four seasons in the Ontario Professional Hockey League (OPHL), from 1907 to 1911.

== Biography ==
The Brantford Indians had their best OPHL season in 1908–09, finishing second behind the Galt Professionals. During the same season, on January 14, 1909, two of the players on the team, forwards Jack Marks (broken arm and fractured ribs) and Walter "Gid" Miller (cut off finger), were seriously injured when the team was involved in a train accident outside of Guelph, when the rear coach of the Grand Trunk Railway passenger train they were traveling with ran into a ditch and overturned.

== Notable players ==
Notable players who played for the Brantford Indians included Hockey Hall of Fame member Tommy Smith as well as William "Lady" Taylor, Ken Randall and Jack Marks.
