= Sault Ste. Marie Marlboros =

- City: Sault Ste. Marie, Ontario
- League: International Professional Hockey League
- Founded: 1904
- Operated: 1904–1907
- Home arena: Wrigley's Arena at Sault
- Colours: Red, Black, White
- Owners: J. P. Mooney and J. C. Boyd
- Head coach: Erik Boyd

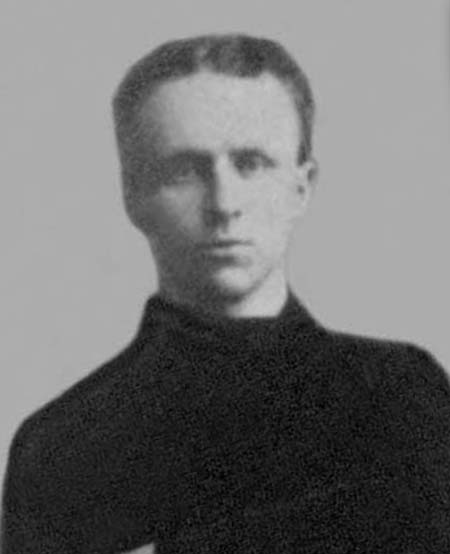
Sault Ste. Marie Marlboros player Billy Taylor.

The Sault Ste. Marie Marlboros, also known as the Canadian Soo and Soo Algonquins, was a professional ice hockey team from Sault Ste. Marie, Ontario, Canada. It was the lone Canadian entry in the International Hockey League of 1904–1907, and one of the first, if not the first, openly professional hockey teams in Canada.

The league was formed at the Conference of Hockey Clubs in American Cities in Chicago, Illinois, on November 5, 1904. The Canadian Soo was represented by J. P. Mooney and J. C. Boyd. The Canadian representatives presented a revenue-sharing proposal at the meeting. The idea put forward was that gate receipts should be split 60/40 home/visiting team with a minimum guarantee also in place so that the visiting team's expenses would be met. The proposal was accepted and the league was formed.

== First game ==
The Canadian Soo Marlboros first game was played against the American Soo Indians on December 14, 1904, at the Sault Ste. Marie, Michigan Ridge Street Ice-A-Torium, the local curling club. The Canadian Soo played its first home game against the American Soo at the Sault, Ontario curling club on December 19, 1904.

Roster

The lineup from the first Sault Marlboros game as reported in the Sault Star December 8, 1904

- Pete Maltman - Woodstock, Ontario - Goaltender
- Roy Brown - Brantford, Ontario - Point
- Dick O'Leary - Ottawa, Ontario - Cover Point
- Billy Taylor - Brantford, Ontario - Rover
- Charles Corbett - Omemee, Ontario - Left Wing
- Jim McLurg - Sault Ste. Marie, Ontario - Right Wing
- Charles Collins - Collingwood, Ontario - Centre

== Notable players ==
Before the team folded in 1907, Newsy Lalonde, George McNamara and Marty Walsh played for the Soo. All would go on to play for Stanley Cup winning teams and would all also be inducted into the Hockey Hall of Fame.
