= 1908 OPHL season =

The 1908 OPHL season was the first season of the Ontario Professional Hockey League. The Toronto Professional Hockey Club had the best record to win the league championship.

Toronto played their home games out of the Mutual Street Rink, Brantford out of the Waterloo Street Rink, Berlin out of the Auditorium and Guelph out of the Royal City Rink.

== Regular season ==
=== Final standing ===
Note GP = Games Played, W = Wins, L = Losses, T = Ties, GF = Goals For, GA = Goals Against

| Team | GP | W | L | T |
|---|---|---|---|---|
| Toronto Pros | 12 | 10 | 2 | 0 |
| Berlin Dutchmen | 12 | 5 | 4 | 3 |
| Brantford Pros | 12 | 4 | 6 | 2 |
| Guelph | 12 | 2 | 9 | 1 |

Source: "Ontario Pro. League Record". The Globe. March 2, 1908. p. 7.

=== Results ===
| Month | Day | Visitor | Score | Home | Score |
|---|---|---|---|---|---|
| Jan. | 3 | Guelph | 4 | Brantford | 2 |
| Jan. | 4 | Toronto | 0 | Berlin | 3 |
| Jan. | 10 | Brantford | 7 | Toronto | 6 |
| Jan. | 10 | Berlin | 7 | Guelph | 2 |
| Jan. | 13 | Guelph | 3 | Toronto | 4 |
| Jan. | 17 | Brantford | 3 | Berlin | 0 |
| Jan. | 18 | Toronto | 7 | Guelph | 2 |
| Jan. | 24 | Brantford | 7 | Guelph | 2 |
| Jan. | 24 | Berlin | 5 | Toronto | 6 |
| Jan. | 30 | Guelph | 1 | Berlin | 5 |
| Feb. | 1 | Toronto | 10 | Brantford | 7 |
| Feb. | 7 | Berlin | 13 | Brantford | 6 |
| Feb. | 10 | Guelph | 2 | Berlin | 3 |
| Feb. | 11 | Brantford | 8 | Toronto | 11 |
| Feb. | 14 | Guelph | 5 | Brantford | 2 |
| Feb. | 15 | Toronto | 5 | Berlin | 4 |
| Feb. | 18 | Berlin | 8 | Brantford | 9 (†) |
| Feb. | 22 | Toronto | 10 | Guelph | 7 |
| Feb. | 25 | Berlin | 1 | Toronto | 9 |
| Feb. | 25 | Brantford | 5 | Guelph | 0 |
| Feb. | 27 | Guelph | 5 | Toronto | 8 |
| Feb. | 29 | Toronto | 12 | Brantford | 3 |
| Mar. | 2 | Berlin | | Guelph | (††) |
| Mar. | 3 | Berlin | | Brantford | (‡) |
| Mar. | 5 | Brantford | 6 | Berlin | 8 |

Sources: Toronto Star, The Brantford Daily Expositor, The Daily Telegraph (Kitchener newspaper)

(†) Berlin protested ineligible player and game was to be replayed on Mar. 3

(††) Guelph forfeit

(‡) Cancelled by mutual agreement. Was supposed to be replay of Feb. 18 game

== Exhibitions ==
After the season, a game was held in Toronto between the Torontos and an All-Star team composed of players from the other teams. Toronto would defeat the All-Stars 16–10.

== Playoffs ==
After the season, Toronto would challenge the ECAHA champion Montreal Wanderers for the Stanley Cup. Toronto would impress the Wanderers with their quality of play, but were defeated 6–4 on March 14 on two late goals by Ernie Johnson and Bruce Stuart.

| Date | Winning Team | Score | Losing Team | Location |
|---|---|---|---|---|
| March 14, 1908 | Montreal Wanderers | 6–4 | Toronto Professionals | Montreal Arena |

| Preceded by First season | OPHL seasons 1908 | Succeeded by 1909 OPHL season |
