= Ontario Professional Hockey League =

Professional ice hockey league in Ontario, Canada

- Sport: Ice hockey
- Founded: 1907
- First season: 1908
- Folded: 1911
- Country: Canada
- Last champion: Galt, Ontario
- Most titles: Galt, Ontario(2)

The Ontario Professional Hockey League (OPHL), sometimes referred to as the Trolley League, and also known as the Canadian Hockey League in its time, was a professional ice hockey league in Canada. It was a fully professional league and consisted of teams from Toronto and surrounding communities. The league's annual champion would challenge for the Stanley Cup, but none were successful.

== History ==
=== Founding ===
The Ontario Professional Hockey League was organized in November 1907. The Toronto Professionals had been playing exhibition games against teams of the International Professional Hockey League and other teams with attendances of over 1,000 per game. In early November 1907, the International League had folded, reducing the number of opponents for Toronto, who could not play any amateur teams in Ontario. At the annual meeting of the Toronto team on November 7, the first discussions of a possible league were held. A founding meeting was held in Berlin, Ontario (now Kitchener) on November 12 where a league was formed with Berlin, Brantford, Guelph, and Toronto. The league's initial name was the "Canadian Hockey League" and the officers were:

- J. P. Downey, M.P.P., Guelph, Hon. President,
- Alex Miln, Toronto, President
- A. B. Burnley, Brantford, Vice-President
- N. E. Irving, Guelph, Secretary
- Otto Vogelsang, Berlin, Treasurer
- J. C. Palmer, Toronto, George Roehmer, Berlin, J. A. Fitzgerald, Guelph and Roy Brown, Brantford (executive)

The league was organized at a meeting on November 22 in Guelph where the schedule was set. The rules would be based on the Ontario Hockey Association and the International League. Representatives of Galt had shown interest in being a part of the league but withdrew their application.

=== Seasons ===
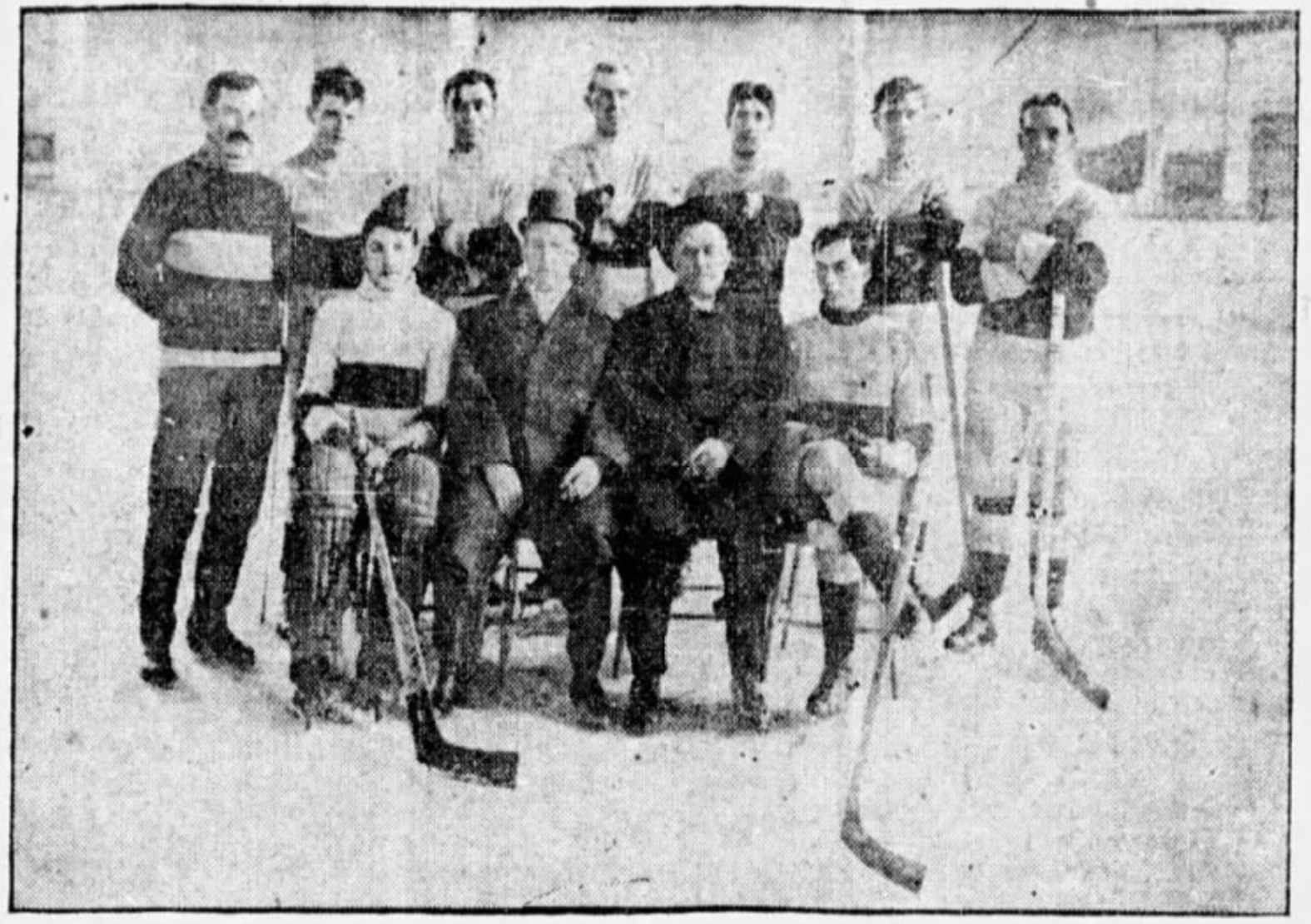
Berlin Dutchmen in 1909–10.

The Toronto team became league champions in the OPHL's first season and challenged for the Stanley Cup in 1908, losing to the champion Montreal Wanderers from the Eastern Canada Amateur Hockey Association (ECAHA). In the 1908 off-season, Brantford left the league and was replaced by Galt and St. Catharines. Galt would win the OPHL championship and Galt challenged for the Stanley Cup in January 1909, losing to Ottawa team of the ECAHA. After the 1909 season, Guelph, St. Catharines and Toronto left the league.

In 1910 the OPHL added the Waterloo Colts to become a four-team league. Berlin got off to such a strong start in the season, that the league decided to start a new season in later January. In March 1910, Berlin challenged the Wanderers for the Cup and were defeated. The league's final attempt to win the Cup came a year later in March 1911, with Galt again losing to Ottawa, which now played in the National Hockey Association (NHA) .

The league disbanded after the 1911 season. The OPHL teams were raided for players by the NHA after the NHA was itself raided for players by the Pacific Coast Hockey Association(PCHA). Players who left included Eddie Oatman, Jack McDonald and Goldie Prodgers. The Moncton Victorias of the Maritime Professional Hockey League (MPHL) signed nearly all of the champion Galt team's players. The Victorias would win the MPHL championship and challenge NHA champion Quebec.

A namesake league would play for one season in 1930–31 with teams in Galt, Guelph, Kitchener, Niagara Falls, Oshawa and Stratford.

== Teams ==
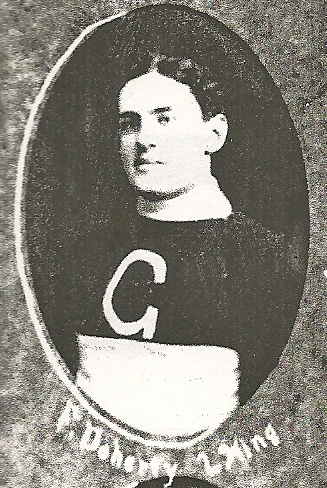
Fred Doherty with the Galt Professionals around 1911.

Season	Teams	Champion
1908	Berlin Dutchmen, Brantford Indians, Guelph Royals, Toronto Pros	Toronto (best record)
1909†	Berlin, Brantford, Galt Professionals, Guelph, St. Catharines Pros, Toronto Pros	Galt (one-game playoff against Brantford)
1910	Berlin, Brantford, Galt, Waterloo Colts	Berlin (best record)
1911	Berlin, Brantford, Galt, Waterloo	Galt (one-game playoff against Waterloo)

† Guelph and St. Catharines withdrew after six games of the schedule.

== See also ==
- List of pre-NHL seasons
- List of ice hockey leagues
